This list includes the general officers in the French service during the French Revolutionary and Napoleonic Wars. From 1789 to 1815, their number exceeded 2,000.

A 

 Jacques Pierre Abbatucci (général de division)
 Jean-Charles Abbatucci (général de brigade)
 Louis Jean Nicolas Abbé (général de division)
 Augustin Gabriel d'Aboville (général de brigade)
 Augustin-Marie d'Aboville (général de brigade)
 François Marie d'Aboville (général de division)
 Michel Jacques François Achard (général de brigade)
 Pierre Age (général de brigade)
 Armand, duc d'Aiguillon (général de brigade)
 Louis-Annibal de Saint-Michel d'Agoult (général de brigade)
 Pierre Nicolas d'Agoult (général de brigade)
 Guillaume François d'Aigremont (général de brigade)
 Joseph Jean-Baptiste Albert (général de division)
 Philippe François Maurice d'Albignac, comte d'Albignac, comte de Ried (général de brigade)
 Louis Alexandre d'Albignac (général de division)
 Pierre Alexandre Joseph Allent (général de division)
 Jacques-Alexandre-François Allix de Vaux, comte de Freudenthal (général de division)
 Louis Alméras (général de division)
 Joseph Perrin des Almons (général de division)
 Pierre d'Almeïda, marquis d'Alorna (général de division)
 Jean-Jacques Ambert (général de division)
 Auguste Jean Joseph Gilbert Ameil (général de division)
 François Pierre Joseph Amey (général de division)
 Louis Ancel (général de brigade)
 Antoine François Andréossy (général de division)
 Victor Antoine Andréossy (général de brigade)
 Jacques Bernard Modeste d'Anselme (général de division)
 Charles Henri Guillaume Anthing (général de division)
 Charles Nicolas d'Anthouard de Vraincourt (général de division)
 François Louis Antoine (général de brigade)
 Eustache Charles Joseph d'Aoust (général de division)
 Joseph Louis d'Arbois de Jubainville (général de brigade)
 Mathieu Joseph d'Arbonneau (général de brigade)
 Pierre Jacques Jean Hector du Bousquet d'Argence (général de brigade)
 François Argod (général de brigade)
 Jean-Jacques d'Argoubet (général de brigade)
 Pierre Argoud (général de brigade)
 Louis François Pierre d'Arlandes de Salton (général de brigade)
 Antoine Arnaud (général de brigade)
 Jean-Baptiste Arnaud (général de brigade)
 Pierre Louis d'Arnauld (général de brigade)
 Jean Toussaint Arrighi de Casanova, duc de Padoue (général de division)
 Jean-Lucq D'Arriule (général de division)
 
 Louis d'Arut de Grandpré (général de division)
 Dominique Joseph Asselin de Williencourt (général de brigade)
 Antoine Victor Augustin d'Auberjon, comte de Murinais (général de brigade)
 Claude Aubert (général de brigade)
 Jean-Baptiste Annibal Aubert du Bayet (général de division)
 René François Jean Aubrée (général de brigade)
 François Aubry (général de division)
 Joseph Gabriel Aubry Darencey (général de brigade)
 Claude Charles Aubry de La Boucharderie (général de division)
 Antoine Jean-Baptiste Aubugeois de La Borde (général de brigade)
 Charles Pierre François Augereau, duc de Castiglione (Maréchal d'Empire)
 Jean-Pierre Augereau (général de division)
 Jean-Baptiste Augier (général de brigade)
 Pierre Aulard (général de brigade)
 Nicolas Grégoire Aulmont de Verrières (général de brigade)
 Louis Marie Guy d'Aumont de Rochebaron (général de division)
 Vincent d'Auriol (général de brigade)
 Pierre Gabriel Aussenac (général de brigade)
 Pierre d'Autancourt (général de brigade)
 Joseph Gaspard Corporandi d'Auvare (général de division)
 Jacques Philippe Avice (général de brigade)
 Vincent Jacques-Etienne Avogari de Gentile (général de division)
 François d'Avrange d'Haugéranville (général de brigade)
 François Charles Jean Pierre Marie d'Avrange d'Haugéranville (général de brigade)
 Jean-Jacques Avril (général de division)
 Antoine Sylvain Avy (général de brigade)
 Wincenty Aksamitowski (général de brigade)
 Antoine Aymard (général de brigade)
 Charles Jean Louis Aymé (général de division)
 François Basile Azemar (général de brigade).

B

Ba 

 Jacques François Bache (général de brigade)
 Louis Alexandre Bachelet-Damville (général de brigade)
 Gilbert Désiré Joseph Bachelu (général de division)
 Felice Pasquale Baciocchi, prince de Piombino (général de division)
 Louis Albert Guislain Bacler d'Albe (général de brigade)
 Jean Bajet (général de brigade)
 François Bagnéris (général de brigade)
 Jean Louis Charles Bagniol (général de brigade)
 Louis Paul Baille, baron de Saint-Pol (général de brigade)
 Louis Willibrod Antoine de Baillet de Latour (général de division)
 Jean-Pierre Baillod (général de division)
 Antoine Raymond Baillot-Faral (général de brigade)
 François Gédéon Bailly de Monthion (général de division)
 Éloi Charles Balathier de Bragelonne (général de brigade)
 Antoine Balland (général de division)
 Basile Guy Marie Victor Baltus de Pouilly (général de division)
 Jean-Louis Bancal de Saint-Julien (général de brigade)
 Gilbert Jacques Bandy de Nalèche (général de brigade)
 Pierre Banel (général de brigade)
 Jean-François de Bar (général de brigade)
 Louis Baraguey d'Hilliers (général de division)
 Gilles Jean Marie Roland de Barazer, chevalier de Kermorvan (général de brigade)
 Joseph Barbanègre (général de brigade)
 Antoine Edme Adam de Barbazan (général de brigade)
 Jean-François Thérèse Barbier (général de brigade)
 Pierre Barbier (général de brigade)
 Marie Étienne de Barbot (général de division)
 Gabriel Barbou des Courières (général de division)
 Antoine Marie Bard (général de division)
 Jacques Bardenet (général de brigade)
 Martial Bardet de Maison-Rouge (général de division)
 Joseph David de Barquier (général de brigade)
 André Horace François de Barral de Rochechinard (général de brigade)
 Paul François Jean Nicolas de Barras (général de division)
 Jean Léonard Barrié (général de brigade)
 Pierre Barrois (général de division)
 Nicolas Barthel (général de division)
 Nicolas Martin Barthélemy (général de brigade)
 Antoine François Barthélemi de Bournet (général de brigade)
 François Barthélemy Beguinot (général de division)
 Jean-Étienne Barthier, baron de Saint-Hilaire (général de brigade)
 Nicolas-Denis de Bas de L'Aulne (général de brigade)
 Anne Charles Basset Montaigu (général de division)
 Pierre Baste (Contre-amiral and général de brigade)
 Louis Bastoul (général de brigade)
 Denis Battin (général de brigade)
 Auguste Nicolas Baudot (général de brigade)
 Pierre François Bauduin (général de brigade)
 Louis-Alexandre-Amélie de Bauduy de Bellevue (maréchal de camp)
 Jean-Baptiste Charles Baurot (général de brigade)
 François de Baussancourt (général de brigade)
 Armand Baville (général de brigade)
 Jean-Baptiste Lecat de Bazancourt (général de brigade).

Be 

 Louis de Beaudiné de Romanet de Lestranges (général de brigade)
 Oliver Victor de Beaudre, ou de Baudre  (général de brigade)
 Jean-Baptiste Beaufol (général de brigade)
 Louis Charles Antoine de Beaufranchet d'Ayat (général de brigade)
 Alexandre François Marie de Beauharnais (général de division)
 Eugène-Rose de Beauharnais, prince d'Eichstaedt, duc de Leuchtenberg, prince de Venise and Viceroy of Italy (général de brigade)
 Edme Henri de Beaujeu (général de brigade)
 Louis-Chrétien Carrière, baron de Beaumont (général de division)
 Marc Antoine de Beaumont (général de division)
 Michel de Beaupuy (général de division)
 Pierre Raphaël Paillot de Beauregard (général de division)
 Louis Ferdinand Baillard de Beaurevoir (général de brigade)
 Louis-Jacques Beauvais (général de brigade)
 Charles Théodore Beauvais de Préau (général de brigade)
 Jean-Pierre Béchaud (général de brigade)
 Louis Samuel Albert Désiré Béchet de Léocour (général de division)
 Nicolas Joseph Bécourt (général de division)
 Jean-Pierre Bedos (général de brigade)
 Louis Paul de Beffroy (général de brigade)
 Jean Antoine Pierre de Béhague de Villeneuve (général de division)
 Nicolas Léonard Beker, comte de Mons (général de division)
 Alexandre Pierre Julienne de Bélair (général de division))
 Antoine Alexandre Julienne de Bélair (général de brigade)
 Jacques Belfort Renard (général de brigade)
 Claude-Henri Belgrand de Vaubois (général de division)
 Jacques Nicolas Bellavène (général de division)
 André de Bellefonte (général de brigade)
 Augustin Daniel Belliard (général de division)
 Louis Henri Charles de Bellon de Sainte-Marguerite (général de brigade)
 David Victor Belly de Bussy (général de brigade)
 François de Briançon de Vachon de Belmont, marquis de Belmont (général de division)
 Sigismond-Frédéric de Berckheim (général de division)
 François Berge (général de brigade)
 Pierre André Hercule Berlier (général de brigade)
 Jean-Baptiste Jules Bernadotte, prince de Pontecorvo (Maréchal d'Empire)
 Jacques Bernard Bernard (général de brigade)
 Simon Bernard (général de division)
 Benoît Guérin de Berneron (général de brigade)
 Jean-François Berruyer (général de division)
 Pierre Marie-Auguste Berruyer (général de brigade)
 Jacques Berthault (général de brigade)
 Étienne Ambroise Berthellemy (général de brigade)
 Pierre Augustin Berthemy (Maréchal de camp)
 Pierre Berthezène (général de division)
 Louis-Alexandre Berthier, prince de Neuchâtel et de Wagram (Maréchal d'Empire)
 Victor Léopold Berthier (général de division)
 Louis César Gabriel Berthier de Berluy (général de division)
 Nicolas Bertin (général de brigade)
 Antoine Marc Augustin Bertoletti (général de brigade)
 Jean-Baptiste Bertolosi (général de brigade)
 Antoine Joseph Bertrand (général de brigade)
 Edme Victor Bertrand (général de brigade)
 Henri Gratien Bertrand (général de division)
 Louis Bertrand de Sivray (général de brigade)
 Antoine Anne Lecourt de Béru (général de division)
 Martial Besse (général de brigade)
 Jean-Baptiste Bessières, duc d'Istrie (Maréchal d'Empire)
 Bertrand Bessières (général de division)
 François Bessières (général de division)
 Jacques de Besson, baron d'Ormeschwiller (général de brigade)
 Jean Alexis Béteille (général de brigade)
 Antoine de Béthencourt (général de brigade)
 Georges Emmanuel Beuret (général de division)
 Frédéric Auguste de Beurmann (général de brigade)
 Jean Ernest de Beurmann (général de brigade)
 Pierre Riel de Beurnonville (Maréchal de France)
 Claude de Beylié (général de brigade)
 Martial Beyrand (général de brigade)
 Jean Romain Conilh de Beyssac (général de brigade)
 Jean Michel Beysser (général de brigade).

Bi 

 Pierre Marie de Bicquilley (général de brigade)
 Jacques Bidoit (général de brigade)
 Auguste Julien Bigarré (général de division)
 Louis de Bigault de Signemont (maréchal de camp)
 Pierre Joseph Billard (général de division)
 Pierre-Louis Binet de Marcognet (général de division)
 Louis François Binot (général de brigade)
 Baptiste Pierre François Jean Gaspard Bisson (général de division)
 Guilin Laurent Bizanet (général de division).

Bl 

 Claude Marie-Joseph Blanc (général de brigade)
 Jean-Jacques Blanc (général de brigade)
 Amable Guy Blancard (général de brigade)
 Charles Étienne Guillaume Blandin de Chalain (général de brigade)
 Marie Pierre Isidore de Blanmont (général de brigade)
 Ange François Blein (général de brigade)
 Jacques Blondeau (général de brigade)
 Antoine François Raymond Blondeau du Fays (général de brigade)
 Louis Blosse (général de brigade)
 Pierre Louis de Blottefière (général de brigade)
 Jean-Antoine de Blou de Chadenac (général de division).

Bo 

 Pierre Bodelin (général de brigade)
 Jean David Boerner (général de brigade)
 Jean Boillaud (général de brigade)
 Jean-Joseph Lamy de Boisconteau (général de brigade)
 Gilles Dominique Jean Marie de Boisgelin de Kerdu (général de brigade)
 Anne Marie François Barbuat de Maison-Rouge de Boisgérard (général de brigade)
 Jacques François Barbuat de Maison-Rouge de Boisgérard (général de brigade)
 Aurèle Jean de Boisserolle-Boisvilliers (général de brigade))
 Joseph-Valérian de Boisset (général de brigade)
 Henri Louis Augustin de Boissieu (général de brigade)
 Louis Régis de Boissy de Bannes (général de brigade)
 Jacques Denis Boivin (général de brigade)
 Guillaume Boivin de la Martiniére (général de brigade)
 François Charles Robert Chonet de Bollemont (général de division)
 Louis André Bon (général de division)
 Christophe Bon d'Estournelles (général de brigade)
 Jérôme Bonaparte (général de division)
 Joseph Bonaparte (général de division)
 Louis Bonaparte (général de division)
 Napoléon Bonaparte (général de division)
 Raymond-Gaspard de Bonardi de Saint-Sulpice (général de division)
 Jean Pierre François Bonet (général de division)
 Jean-François Marie de Bongard ou Bongars (général de brigade)
 Jean-Baptiste Bonnafoux de Caminel (général de brigade)
 Jean-Gérard Bonnaire (général de brigade)
 Louis Bonnaire (général de division)
 Charles Auguste Jean-Baptiste Louis-Joseph Bonnamy de Bellefontaine (général de brigade)
 Charles Robert André Bonnard (général de brigade)
 Ennemond Bonnard (général de division)
 Jacques Philippe Bonnaud (général de division)
 Jacques Bonnay de Troisfontaines (général de brigade)
 Pierre Bonnemains (général de division)
 Alexandre François Séraphin Bonnet (général de brigade)
 François Antoine Bonnet (général de brigade)
 Joseph Alphonse Hyacinthe Alexandre de Bonnet d'Honnières (général de brigade)
 Michel Louis Joseph Bonté, Baron de St Goazec (général de division)
 François Bontemps (général de brigade)
 Charles de Bonvoust (général de brigade)
 François Bony (général de brigade)
 Étienne Tardif de Pommeroux de Bordesoulle, comte de Bordessoulle (général de division)
 Camille Borghèse, Prince of Sulmona and of Rossano, Duke and Prince of Gustalla (général de division)
 François Borghèse (général de brigade)
 Pierre Honoré Bories de Castelpers (général de brigade)
 Jean-Baptiste Joseph Noël Borrel (général de brigade)
 Charles Luc Paulin Clément Borrelli (général de division)
 Jacques Marie Botot-Dumesnil (général de brigade)
 Pierre-Paul Botta (général de brigade)
 Alexandre François Joseph de Boubers-Mazingan (général de brigade)
 Jean-François Bouchel Merenveüe (général de division)
 Benoît-Louis Bouchet (général de division)
 François Louis Bouchu (général de division)
 Jean-Pierre Boucret (général de division)
 Jean Boudet (général de division)
 François Louis Boudin de Roville (général de brigade)
 Jacques Jean-Marie François Boudin, comte de Tromelin (général de division)
 Jean-Claude Boudinhon-Valdec (général de brigade)
 Louis de Bouillé (général de division)
 Jean Fortuné Boüin de Marigny (général de brigade)
 Servais Beaudouin Boulanger (général de brigade)
 Henri François Maurille de Boulard (général de brigade)
 Jean-François Boulart (général de brigade)
 Louis Jacques François Boulnois (général de division)
 François Antoine Louis Bourcier (général de division)
 Edme Martin Bourdois de Champfort (général de brigade)
 Jérôme-Dominique Bourgeat (général de brigade)
 Charles-François Bourgeois (général de brigade)
 Louis-Auguste-Victor, Count de Ghaisnes de Bourmont, (général de brigade)
 Jean Raymond Charles Bourke (général de division)
 Jean-Baptiste Boussard (général de brigade)
 André Joseph Boussart (général de division)
 Gilbert Boutarel de Langerolle (général de brigade)
 Jean-Philippe Boutteaux (général de brigade)
 Jean Louis Éloi Bouvard (général de brigade)
 Joseph Bouvier des Éclaz (général de brigade)
 Louis François Boy (général de brigade)
 Jacques Boyé (général de brigade)
 Charles Joseph Boyé, baron d'Abaumont (général de brigade)
 Louis Léger Boyeldieu (général de division)
 Henri Jacques Jean Boyer (général de brigade)
 Jean-Baptiste Nicolas Henri Boyer (général de brigade)
 Joseph Boyer (général de brigade)
 Pierre François Xavier Boyer (général de division)
 Joseph Boyer de Rébeval (général de division).

Br 

 Michel Silvestre Brayer (général de division)
 Joseph Breissand (général de brigade)
 Antoine François Brenier-Montmorand (général de division)
 Jean-Pierre Alexandre Bresson de Valmabelle (général de brigade)
 Jean-Baptiste Breton (général de brigade)
 Louis-Adrien Brice De Montigny (général de division)
 André Louis Elisabeth Marie Briche (général de division)
 Louis Hercule Timoléon de Cossé, duc de Brissac (général de division)
 Hugues Brisset de Montbrun de Pomarède (général de brigade)
 Victor-François de Broglie (général de brigade)
 André François Bron de Bailly (général de brigade)
 Nicolas Bronikowski, comte d'Oppeln (général de division)
 Étienne Brouard (général de brigade)
 Jean-Baptiste Broussier (général de division)
 David Hendrikius Bruce (général de brigade)
 Jean Pierre Joseph Bruguière (général de division)
 Nicolas Brulé (général de brigade)
 Claude Louis Brun (général de brigade)
 Jacques François Brun (général de brigade)
 Jean Antoine Brun (général de brigade)
 Louis Bertrand Pierre Brun de Villeret (général de division)
 Guillaume Marie-Anne Brune (Maréchal d'Empire)
 Gaspard Jean-Baptiste Brunet (général de division)
 Jean-Baptiste Brunet (général de division)
 Vivant-Jean Brunet-Denon (général de brigade)
 Gilles Joseph Martin Bruneteau (général de division)
 Jean-Chrysostôme Bruneteau de Sainte-Suzanne, (général de brigade)
 François-Xavier Bruno (général de brigade)
 Adrien François de Bruno (général de brigade)
 Jean-Baptiste Bruny (général de brigade)
 Christophe Joseph de Brusselles (général de brigade)
 Nicolas Ernault de Rignac Des Bruslys (général de division).

Bu 

 Jacques Bonaventure Buchet (général de brigade)
 Charles André Buchold (général de brigade)
 Claude Joseph Buget (général de division)
 Charles Joseph Buquet (général de brigade)
 Louis Léopold Buquet (général de brigade)
 Pierre Auguste François de Burcy (général de brigade)
 André Burthe (général de brigade)
 Jacques Butraud (général de brigade).

C

Ca 

 Marc Cabanes de Puymisson (général de brigade)
 Jean-Baptiste Cacault (général de brigade)
 Louis Marie Joseph Maximilien de Caffarelli du Falga (général de brigade)
 Marie-François Auguste de Caffarelli du Falga (général de division)
 Jean Alexandre Caffin (général de brigade)
 Jean-Jacques Caillet (général de brigade)
 Hubert Callier, baron de Saint-Apollin (général de division)
 François René Cailloux (général de brigade)
 Étienne Nicolas de Calon (général de brigade)
 André Carvin (général de brigade)
 Jean-Pierre-Hugues Cambacérès (général de brigade)
 Alexis Aimé Pierre Cambray (général de division)
 Pierre Jacques Étienne Cambronne (général de brigade)
 Isaac Jacques Delart Campagnol (général de brigade)
 François Frédéric Campana (général de brigade)
 Toussaint Campi (général de division)
 Jacques David Martin de Campredon (général de division)
 Louis-Auguste Camus (général de brigade)
 Christian François Camus, baron de Richemont (général de brigade)
 Jean Lecamus, baron de Moulignon (général de brigade)
 Louis Camus (général de brigade)
 Jean Baptiste Camille de Canclaux (général de division)
 Jacques Lazare Savettier de Candras, baron de La Tour de Pré (général de brigade)
 Samuel Canier (général de brigade) (Irlande)
 Charles de Canolles de Lescours (général de brigade)
 Simon Canuel (général de division)
 Claude Antoine Capon de Château-Thierry (général de brigade)
 Joseph Carcome-Lobo (général de division)
 Bernard Augustin Cardenau (général de brigade)
 Jean Pascal Raymond Carlenc (général de division)
 Jacques de Carles (général de division)
 Claude Marie Carnot de Feulins (général de division)
 Lazare Nicolas Marguerite Carnot (général de division)
 Antoine Jean Henri de Carové (général de brigade)
 François Carpantier (général de brigade)
 Claude Carra de Saint-Cyr (général de division)
 Joseph Emmanuel Laurrans du Carrel de Charly (général de brigade)
 Jean Augustin Carrié de Boissy (général de brigade)
 Louis-Anthelme Carrier (général de brigade)
 Louis Chrétien Carrière (général de division)
 Martin Jean François de Carrion de Loscondes (général de brigade)
 Jean-François Carteaux (général de division)
 Antoine Bénédict Carteret (général de division)
 Jean-Baptiste Jacques Cartier (général de brigade)
 Joseph Marie de Casabianca (général de division)
 Raphaël de Casabianca (général de division)
 Antoine Philippe Darius Casalta (général de brigade)
 Louis Victorin Cassagne (général de division)
 Pierre Cassagne (général de brigade)
 Louis Pierre Jean Aphrodise Cassan (général de brigade)
 Jean Castelbert de Castelverd (général de division)
 Nicolas Antoine Xavier Castella de Berlens (général de brigade)
 Pierre François Gilbert Castella (général de brigade)
 Simon Nicolas Constantin de Castella de Montagny (général de brigade)
 Boniface Louis André de Castellane (général de division)
 Bertrand Pierre Castex (général de division)
 Joseph Léon Cathelan (général de brigade)
 Bernard Louis Cattaneo (général de division)
 Armand Augustin Louis de Caulaincourt, duc de Vicence (général de division)
 Auguste Jean-Gabriel de Caulaincourt (général de division)
 Gabriel Louis de Caulaincourt (général de division)
 Jean-Jacques Causse (général de brigade)
 Pierre-Jean de Caux de Blacquetot (général de brigade)
 Jean-Baptiste de Caux de Blacquetot (général de division)
 Louis-Victor de Caux de Blacquetot (général de brigade)
 Jacques Marie Cavaignac (général de division)
 Jean-Baptiste Alexandre Cavrois (général de brigade)
 Louis-Joseph Cavrois (général de brigade)
 Louis-Joseph Elisabeth Cazals (général de brigade).

Ce-Ch 

 Jean-Baptiste Cervoni (général de division)
 Gaspard Chabert (général de brigade)
 Pierre Chabert (général de brigade)
 Théodore Chabert (général de division)
 Louis François Jean Chabot (général de division)
 Joseph Chabran (général de division)
 Jacques Aimard de Moreton de Chabrillan (général de division)
 Jacques Henri Sébastien César de Moreton de Chabrillan (général de division)
 Pierre François Xavier Chaillet de Verges (général de brigade)
 Alexis Chalbos (général de division)
 Jacques-Antoine de Chambarlhac de Laubespin (général de division)
 Dominique-André de Chambarlhac (général de division)
 Pierre Joseph du Chambge d'Elbhecq, (général de division)
 François Chambon (général de brigade)
 Scipion Charles Victor Auguste de La Garde, marquis de Chambonas (général de brigade)
 Jean Marie Hector Crottier, marquis de Chambonas de Peyrault (général de brigade)
 Louis Joseph Jean-Baptiste de la Boëssière, comte de Chambors (général de division)
 Claude Souchon de Chameron ou Chamron (général de brigade)
 Vital Joachim Chamorin (général de brigade)
 Pierre Clément de Champeaux (général de brigade)
 Jean Étienne Vachier Championnet (général de division)
 Marie Pierre Félix Chesnon de Champmorin (général de brigade)
 Gaspard Adrien Bonnet du Louvat de Champollon (général de division)
 David Maurice Champouliès de Barrau de Muratel (général de brigade)
 François d'Hillaire de Chamvert (général de brigade)
 Jean-Nestor de Chancel (général de division)
 Jean-Baptiste Victor Chanez (général de brigade)
 Antoine Chanlatte (général de brigade)
 Antoine Pierre Joseph Chapelle, marquis de Jumilhac (général de division)
 Jean-Antoine Chapsal (général de division)
 Antoine Chapt de Rastignac (général de brigade)
 René-Bernard Chapuy (général de brigade)
 Louis Charbonnier (général de division)
 Joseph Claude Marie Charbonnel, comte de Salès (général de division)
 Alexis Antoine Charlery (général de brigade)
 Étienne Charlet (général de division)
 Hugues Charlot (général de brigade)
 Jean-Baptiste Charnotet (général de brigade)
 Henri François Marie Charpentier (général de division)
 Joseph Charras (général de brigade)
 Jean-Louis Charrière (général de brigade)
 Charles-François Charton (général de brigade)
 Joachim Charton (général de brigade)
 Claude Louis Chartongne (général de brigade)
 Jean Hyacinthe Sébastien Chartrand (général de brigade)
 David Henri Chassé (général de division)
 François de Chasseloup-Laubat (général de division)
 Thomas Jean Chassereaux (général de brigade)
 Joachim Chastanier de Burac (général de brigade)
 Louis Pierre Aimé Chastel (général de division)
 Achille François du Chastellet (général de division)
 Armand Marie Jacques de Chastenet, marquis de Puységur, (général de brigade)
 Alexandre Paul Guérin de Châteauneuf-Randon, marquis de Joyeuse (général de division)
 Pierre Guillaume Chaudron-Roussau (général de brigade)
 François Pierre Alexandre Chauvel (général de brigade)
 Jacques Chazeau-Duteil (général de brigade)
 Jean-Pierre François de Chazot (général de division)
 Jean Chemineau (général de division)
 Louis Nicolas Hyacinthe Chérin (général de division)
 Dominique Prosper de Chermont (général de brigade)
 Jacques François Chevalier (général de brigade)
 Pierre Chevalier (général de brigade)
 Jean Armand Chevalleau de Boisragon (général de brigade)
 Augustin René Christophe de Chevigné (général de division)
 Józef Chłopicki baron (général de division)
 Pierre Ambroise François Choderlos de Laclos (général de brigade)
 Louis Antoine Choin de Montgay baron de Montchoisy (général de division)
 Antoine César de Choiseul Praslin (général de brigade)
 Claude Gabriel de Choisy (général de division)
 Jacques Robert Souslier, baron de Choisy (général de brigade)
 Louis-Claude Chouard (général de brigade)
 Guillaume Xavier Chrétien (général de brigade)
 Joseph Christiani (général de brigade)
 Jean-François Christophe (général de brigade)
 Nicolas-François Christophe (général de brigade).

Cl 

 Michel Marie Claparède (général de division)
 Henri Jacques Guillaume Clarke (général de division)
 Bertrand Clausel (général de division, Maréchal de France)
 Pierre Clavel (général de brigade)
 Louis Clemencet (général de brigade)
 Claude Clément (général de brigade)
 Jacques-Valère Clément (général de brigade)
 François Marie Clément de La Roncière (général de division)
 Gabriel-Joseph Clément (général de brigade)
 Antoine-Marguerite Clerc (général de brigade)
 Augustin Clerveaux (général de brigade)
 Jean Christophe Louis Frédéric Ignace de Closen (général de brigade).

Co 

 Jean-François Coayllet (général de brigade)
 Antoine Christophe Cochois (général de brigade)
 Louis Jacques de Coehorn (général de brigade)
 Charles Yves César Cyr du Coëtlosquet (général de division)
 Jean-Baptiste de La Rivière de Montreuil de Coincy (général de division)
 Jacques Colas (général de brigade)
 Claude Sylvestre Colaud (général de division)
  (général de division)
 Auguste François-Marie de Colbert-Chabanais (général de brigade)
 Pierre David de Colbert-Chabanais (général de division)
 François Coliny (général de brigade)
 Jean Antoine de Collaert (général de brigade)
 Jean Théodore Colle (général de brigade)
 Georges Henri Victor Collot
 Jean Christophe Collin (général de division)
 Louis Léonard Antoine Joseph Gaspard Venance, marquis de Colli-Ricci (général de division)
 Georges Henri Victor Collot (général de brigade)
 Joseph Antoine Colomb (général de brigade)
 Pierre Colomb (général de brigade)
 Jean Antoine François Combelle (général de division)
 Jean-François Combez (général de brigade)
 Jacques Jean Stanislas Combis (général de brigade)
 Marc-Antoine Commaire (général de division)
 Jean André Commes (général de brigade)
 Jean Dominique Compans (général de division)
 Claude Antoine Compère (général de brigade)
 Louis Fursy Henri Compère (général de brigade)
 Jacques Marie Joseph Conigliano-Carenthal (général de brigade)
 Nicolas François Conroux, baron de Pépinville (général de division)
 Vincent Marie Constantini (général de brigade)
 Claude Louis Constant Esprit Juvénal Corbineau (général de brigade)
 Jean-Baptiste Juvénal Corbineau (général de division)
 Joseph Corda (général de division)
 Étienne Jean-François Cordellier-Delanoüe (général de division)
 André François Corderan (général de brigade)
 André-Philippe Corsin (général de division)
 Roch Joseph Laurent Hyacinthe Corte (général de brigade)
 Antoine Alexandre de Cosson (général de brigade)
 Justin Théodore Coucourt (général de brigade)
 Joseph Christophe Couin, baron de Grandchamp (général de brigade)
 Annet-Antoine Couloumy (général de brigade)
 Jean Guillaume de Courpon (général de brigade)
 Jean Antoine Adrien de Courten (général de brigade)
 Pierre Antoine Courtot (général de division)
 Elzéar Auguste Cousin de Dommartin (général de division)
 Guy Coustard de Saint-Lo (général de division)
 Anne Jacques François Cousteau de Labarrère (général de brigade)
 Louis François Coutard (général de division)
 Jacques Joseph Couture (général de brigade)
 Charles Auguste Creutzer (général de brigade)
 Jean Ignace Crevoisier (général de brigade)
 Félix François Dorothée de Balbes de Berton de Crillon (général de division)
 Louis Pierre Nolasque de Balbes de Berton de Crillon (général de division)
 Arnold Croiset (général de brigade)
 Joseph Crousat (général de brigade)
 Henri Crublier d'Opterre (général de brigade)
 Anne Emmanuel François Georges de Crussol d'Amboise (général de division)
 Nicolas Cugnot d'Aubigny (général de brigade)
 Jean Nicolas Curély (général de brigade)
 Philibert Jean-Baptiste François Curial (général de division)
 Jean-Baptiste Théodore Curto (général de division)
 Adam Philippe de Custine, baron de Sarreck (général de division).

 D 

 Da 

 Jean Melchior Dabadie de Bernet (général de brigade)
 Hermann Wilhelm Daendels (général de division)
 Luc Siméon Auguste Dagobert de Fontenille (général de division)
 Nicolas Dahlmann (général de brigade)
 Jean-Baptiste Dalesme (général de division)
 Claude Dallemagne (général de division)
 Alexandre d'Alton (général de division)
 François-Étienne de Damas (général de division)
 Achille Pierre Henri Picot de Dampierre (général de brigade)
 Auguste Marie Henri Picot de Dampierre (général de division)
 Jean Danglars-Bassignac (général de brigade)
 Louis Danloup-Verdun (général de brigade)
 André Charles Emmanuel Danzel (général de brigade)
 Louis Gaspard Dard d'Espinay (général de brigade)
 Charles Ambroise Dardenne (général de brigade)
 Paul Louis Dargiot de La Ferrière (général de brigade)
 Jean Barthélemy Claude Toussaint Darmagnac (général de division)
 Jacques Darnaud (général de division)
 Jean Boniface Darnaud (général de brigade)
 Henri Pierre Darnaudat (général de brigade)
 Augustin Darricau (général de division)
 Jean-Lucq Darriule (général de division)
 Pierre Bruno Daru (intendant général)
 Michel Jean Paul Daudiès (général de brigade)
 Joseph Augustin Fournier (général de division)
 Marie-Guillaume Daumas (général de brigade)
 Pierre Daumesnil (général de division)
 Charles Daurier (général de division)
 Guillaume Dauture (général de brigade)
 Jean-Baptiste Davaine (général de brigade)
 Jean Antoine David (général de brigade)
 Jean Davin (général de brigade)
 Joseph-Guillaume Davisard (général de brigade)
 Louis Alexandre Edme François Davout (général de brigade)
 Louis Nicolas Davout, duc d'Auerstaedt, prince d'Eckmühl (Maréchal d'Empire)
 Jean-Jacques Dazemar (général de brigade)

 De 

 Auguste Jean-Baptiste Debelle (général de brigade)
 César Alexandre Debelle, baron de La Gachetière (général de brigade)
 Jean-François Joseph Debelle (général de division)
 Jean Louis Debilly (général de brigade)
 Armand Louis Debroc (général de brigade)
 Jean-Baptiste Debrun (général de division)
 Charles Mathieu Isidore Decaen (général de division)
 Nicolas Declaye (général de brigade)
 Pierre Decouz (général de division)
 Vincent Martel Deconchy (général de division)
 François Louis Dedon-Duclos (général de division)
 Jean-Marie Antoine Defrance (général de division)
 François Emmanuel Dehaies (général de division)
 Jean Antoine Dejean (général de brigade)
 Jean François Aimé Dejean (général de division)
 Pierre François Marie Auguste Dejean (général de division)
 Amable Henri Delaage (général de division)
 Henri-Pierre Delaage, baron de Saint-Cyr (général de brigade)
 Mathieu Delabassée (général de brigade)
 Henri François Delaborde (général de division)
 Charles-Henri Delacroix (général de brigade)
 Antoine Charles Bernard Delaitre (général de division)
 Alexandre Delalain (général de division)
 Charles Nicolas Adrien Delanney (général de brigade)
 Jean-Baptiste Gabriel Marie Emmanuel Delapointe (général de brigade)
 Jean-Baptiste Grégoire Delaroche (général de division)
 Louis Pierre François Delattre (général de division)
 Jacques Charles René Delaunay (général de division)
 Victor Joseph Delcambre, baron de Champvert (général de brigade)
 François-Joseph Augustin Delegorgue (général de brigade)
 Jean-Marie Noël Delisle de Falcon, vicomte de Saint-Geniès (général de division)
 Jean-Pierre Dellard (général de brigade)
 Antoine Guillaume Delmas (général de division)
 Jacques-Antoine-Adrien Delort (général de division)
 Marie Joseph Raymond Delort (général de division)
 Jean-François Delort de Gléon (général de brigade)
 Louis Pierre Delosme (général de division)
 Antoine Joseph Delpierre (général de brigade)
 Alexis Joseph Delzons (général de division)
 Marc Jean Demarçay (général de brigade)
 Denis Joseph Demauroy (général de brigade)
 Jean Dembarrère (général de division)
 Ludwik Mateusz Dembowski, baron (général de brigade)
 Joseph Laurent Demont (général de division)
 Joseph Marie Denayer (général de brigade)
 Georges Frédéric Dentzel (général de brigade)
 Louis Jean Depetit de La Salle (général de brigade)
 Jacques François Henri Deplanque (général de brigade)
 Charles François Deponthon (général de division)
 Albert François Deriot (général de division)
 Paul Ferdinand Stanislas Dermoncourt (général de brigade)
 Nicolas Roques (général de division)
 Pierre César Dery (général de brigade)
 Jean-Charles Desailly (général de brigade)
 Louis Charles Antoine Desaix (général de division)
 Sylvain François Desbordes (général de brigade)
 Charles François Desbureaux (général de division)
 Jacques Antoine Deschamps de la Varenne (général de brigade)
 Jacques Ollivier Desclozeaux (général de brigade)
 Jean-François Louis Picault Desdorides (général de brigade)
 Jacques Philippe Desemery (général de brigade)
 Nicolas Joseph Desenfans (général de brigade)
 Edme Étienne Borne Desfourneaux (général de division)
 Antoine Grange (général de brigade)
 François-Ganivet Desgraviers-Berthelot (général de brigade)
 Michel Vandebergues (général de brigade)
 Antoine Auguste Desherbiers de Létanduère (général de brigade)
 Jacques Jardin (général de division)
 François Antoine Denoyé (général de division)
 Éloi Laurent Despeaux (général de division)
 Hyacinthe François Joseph Despinoy (général de division)
 Charles Joseph Paul Leyris Desponchès (général de brigade)
 Albert Victoire Despret (général de brigade)
 François Alexandre Desprez (général de division)
 Joseph Marie Dessaix (général de division)
 Victor Abel Dessalles (général de brigade)
 Jean-Louis Dessaubaz (général de brigade)
 Bernard Dessein (général de division)
 Jean Joseph Dessolles (général de division)
 Jean-Marie Eléonore Léopold Destabenrath (général de brigade)
 Jacques Zacharie Destaing (général de division)
 Anne Louis Claude Destutt comte de Tracy (général de brigade)
 Jean-Jacques Desvaux de Saint-Maurice (général de division)
 Louis-Charles Lenoir (général de brigade)
 Nicolas Philibert Desvernois (général de brigade)
 François Laquet (général de brigade)
 François Detrès (général de division)
 Louis Marie François Paul Devaulx (général de division)
 Marie Jean-Baptiste Urbain Devaux (général de brigade)
 Philippe Devaux de Vautray (général de brigade)
 Pierre Devaux (général de brigade)
 François-Joseph Deverchin (général de brigade)
 Laurent Deviau de Saint-Sauveur (général de brigade)
 Claude Germain Louis Devilliers (général de division)

 Di 

 Alexandre César Hilarion Esprit Dianous de La Perrotine (général de brigade)
 Antoine Claude Dièche (général de division)
 Rodolphe de Diesbach (général de brigade)
 Frédéric de Diesbach (général de brigade)
 Dominique Diettmann (général de division)
 Jean-Pierre Alexandre Dieudé (général de brigade)
 Alexandre, vicomte Digeon (général de division)
 Armand Joseph Henri Digeon (général de division)
 Antoine Digonet (général de brigade)
 Arthur de Dillon (général de brigade)
 Theobald de Dillon (général de brigade)

 Do 

 Guillaume Dode de La Brunerie (général de division)
 Jean-Pierre Doguereau (général de brigade)
 Jean Henri Dąbrowski (général de division)
 Jean-Baptiste Dommanget (général de brigade)
 Jean-Siméon Domon (général de division)
 Jean Donadieu (général de brigade)
 Gabriel Donnadieu (général de division)
 Frédéric Guillaume de Donop (général de brigade)
 François-Xavier Donzelot (général de division)
 François Amédée Doppet (général de division)
 Jacques Dorbay (général de division)
 Joseph Dornes (général de brigade)
 Jacques Louis Dornier (général de brigade)
 Jean Marie Pierre Dorsenne (général de division)
 Jean Philippe Raymond Dorsner (général de division)
 Jean-Jacques Dortoman (général de brigade)
 Pierre Doucet (général de brigade)
 Jean-Pierre Doumerc (général de division)
 Jean-François Dours (général de division)

 Dr 

 Jacques Marie Charles de Drouas de Boussey (général de brigade)
 François-Richer Drouet (général de brigade)
 Jean-Baptiste Drouet d'Erlon (Maréchal de France)
 Antoine Drouot (général de division)
 Louis Pierre Milcolombe Drummond, comte de Melfort (général de brigade)

 Du 

 Paul-Alexis Dubois (général de division)
 Edmond Louis Alexis Dubois de Crancé (général de division)
 Jacques Charles Dubois de Thimville (général de brigade)
 Adrien Jean-Baptiste Amable Ramond du Bosc, comte du Dutaillis (général de division)
 Louis Dubouquet (général de division)
 Marie Anne Jean Alexandre Dubreil (général de brigade)
 Jean-Louis Dubreton (général de division)
 Jean Nicolas Xavier Ducasse (général de brigade)
 Nicolas Joseph Ducellier (général de brigade)
 Nicolas Ducheyron (général de brigade)
 Pierre Alexis Duclaux (général de brigade)
 Nicolas Ducos (général de brigade)
 François Bertrand Dufour (général de brigade)
 François Marie Dufour (général de division)
 Georges Joseph Dufour (général de division)
 Simon Camille Dufresse (général de brigade)
 Eléonor Bernard Anne Christophe Zoa Dufriche, baron de Valazé (général de division)
 Jacques François Coquille (général de division)
 Louis François Auguste Mazel du Goulot (général de brigade)
 Charles François Joseph Dugua (général de division)
 Philibert Guillaume Duhesme (général de brigade)
 Charles François Duhoux (général de division)
 Jean Lambert Marchal, chevalier Dujard (général de brigade)
 Charles François Dulauloy, comte de Randon (général de division)
 Louis Étienne Dulong de Rosnay (général de division)
 Anne Joseph Dumas (général de brigade)
 Guillaume Mathieu Dumas de Saint-Marcel (général de brigade)
 Thomas-Alexandre Dumas (général de division) 
 Jean Louis Dumas (général de brigade)
 Mathieu Dumas (général de division)
 Pierre Marie Joseph Salomon (général de division)
 Jean-Baptiste Dumonceau de Bergendael (général de division)
 Charles Dumoulin (général de brigade)
 Pierre Charles Dumoulin (général de brigade)
 Charles François Dumouriez (général de division)
 Pierre Dumoustier (général de division)
 Pierre Dumoutier (général de brigade)
 Martin François Dunesme (général de brigade)
 Pierre Louis Dupas (général de division)
 René Joseph Dupeyroux (général de brigade)
 Léonard Duphot (général de brigade)
 Pierre Antoine Dupont-Chaumont (général de division)
 Pierre Dupont de l'Étang (général de division)
 Jean Duppelin (général de brigade)
 Hyacinthe Roger Duprat (général de division)
 Jean Étienne Benoît Duprat (général de brigade)
 Claude-François Duprès (général de brigade)
 Dominique Martin Dupuy (général de brigade)
 François Victor Dupuy de Saint-Florent (général de brigade)
 Florent Joseph Duquesnoy (général de division)
 François Marie Durand (général de brigade)
 Michel Durand (général de brigade)
 Luc Joseph Jean Duranteau de Baune (général de brigade)
 Antoine Duret (général de brigade)
 Géraud Christophe Michel Duroc, duc de Frioul (général de division)
 Antoine Jean Auguste Henri Durosnel (général de division)
 Antoine Simon Durrieu (général de division)
 Pierre François Joseph Durutte (général de division)
 Gilbert Louis Robinet Duteil d'Ozane (général de division)
 François Dutertre (général de brigade)
 Étienne Marie Dutilh (général de brigade)
 Claude-Thomas Dutour de Noirfosse (général de brigade)
 Jacques Dutruy (général de division)
 Blaise Duval (général de division)
 François Raymond Duval (général de brigade)
 Alexis Jean Henri Duverger (général de division)
 Joseph Duverger (général de division)
 Bernard Étienne Marie Duvignau (général de brigade)
 Jean-Pierre Thomas Duvignau (général de brigade)
 Charles Siffrein d'Anselme Duvignot (général de brigade)

 E 

 Gaspard Eberlé (général de brigade)
 Jean-Baptiste Eblé (général de division)
 Jean Georges Edighoffen (général de brigade)
 August Karl von und zu Egloffstein (généralmajor)
 Jean Marie Rodolphe Eickemeyer (général de brigade)
 François Henri d'Elbée de La Sablonnière (général de brigade)
 Jacob Job Elie (général de division)
 Balthazar Joseph Emond d'Esclevin (général de brigade)
 Georges Henri Eppler (général de brigade)
 Charles Louis d'Erlach de Jegenstorf (général de brigade)
 Jean Augustin Ernouf (général de division)
 François Ignace Ervoil d'Oyré (général de brigade)
 Charles Marie Robert d'Escorches de Sainte-Croix (général de brigade)
 Marie Louis Henri d'Escorches de Sainte-Croix, marquis de Sainte-Croix (général de brigade)
 Jacques Henri Esnard (général de brigade)
 Jean-Louis-Brigitte Espagne (général de division)
 Jean Jacques Pierre d'Esparbès de Lussan (général de division)
 Jean-Marc Espert de Bulach (général de brigade)
 Jean-Baptiste Espert de Latour (général de brigade)
 Pierre Espert de Sibra (général de brigade)
 Antoine Joseph Marie d'Espinassy de Fontanelle (général de brigade)
 Étienne Estève (général de brigade)
 Jean-Baptiste Estève de Latour (général de brigade)
 François-Joseph d'Estienne de Chaussegros, vicomte de Léry (général de brigade)
 Sixte d'Estko (général de brigade)
 Louis Marie d'Estourmel (général de division)
 Jean Skey Eustace (général de brigade)
 Louis Auguste Frédéric Evain (général de division)
 Charles Joseph Evers (général de division)
 Philippe Evrard de Longeville (général de brigade)
 Marie Scipion d'Exéa (général de brigade)
 Rémi Joseph Isidore Exelmans (général de division)

 F 

 Fa 

 Gabriel Jean Fabre (général de division)
 Jean Fabre de La Martillière (général de division)
 Joseph Vincent Dominique Fabre (général de brigade)
 Gabriel Louis Sabas de Faivre (général de brigade)
 Philippe Casimir de Falk (général de division)
 Victor Claude Alexandre Fanneau de Lahorie (général de brigade)
 Pierre Joseph Farine du Creux (général de brigade)
 Marie François Étienne César de Faucher (général de brigade)
 Jean-Louis-François Fauconnet (général de division)
 François Claude Joachim Faultrier de l'Orme (général de division)
 Simon de Faultrier (général de brigade)
 Chrétien François Antoine Faure de Gière (général de brigade)
 Jean-Baptiste Favart (général de brigade)
 Nicolas Remi Favart d'Herbigny (général de division)
 Charles François Léger Favereau (général de division)
 Jean Dominique Favereau (général de division)

 Fe 

 Dominique François Xavier Félix (général de brigade)
 Claude François Ferey baron de Rosengath (général de division)
 Pierre Marie Bartholomé Férino (général de division)
 François Fériol (général de brigade)
 Jean Louis Joseph César de Fernig (général de brigade)
 Jacques Ferrand (général de division)
 Jean Henri Becays Ferrand (général de division)
 Jean-Louis Ferrand (général de division)
 Gratien Ferrier (général de brigade)
 Pierre Joseph de Ferrier du Chatelet (général de division)
 Joseph Martin Madeleine Ferrière (général de brigade)
 Jean-Baptiste Michel Féry (général de brigade)

 Fi 

 Florentin Ficatier (général de brigade)
 Jean Edmond Filhol de Camas (général de brigade)
 Charles François Filon (général de brigade)
 Pascal Antoine Fiorella (général de division)
 Edmé Nicolas Fiteau, comte de Saint-Étienne (général de brigade)
 François Louis de Fitte, comte de Soucy (général de brigade).

 Fl 

 Auguste Charles Joseph de Flahaut de La Billarderie (général de division)
 Jean-François Flamand (général de brigade)

 Fo 

 Charles François Monin de Folenay (général de brigade)
 François-Xavier Octavie Fontaine (général de brigade)
 Jacques Fontane (général de division)
 Alexandre-Louis de Fontbonne (général de division)
 Jean-Marie Forest (général de brigade)
 François Louis Forestier (général de brigade)
 Gaspard François Forestier (général de brigade)
 Gaspard Hilarion Fornier d'Albe (général de brigade)
 Jacques Marguerite Étienne de Fornier (général de brigade)
 Dominique Casimir Fornier de Valaurie (général de brigade)
 Bruno Nicolas Foubert de Bizy (général de division)
 Louis François Foucher de Careil (général de division)
 Albert Louis Emmanuel de Fouler, comte de Relingue (général de division)
 Joseph Daultanne (général de division)
 Jean-Louis Fournier (général de division)
 François Fournier-Sarlovèze (général de division)
 François Fournier-Verrières (général de brigade)
 Maximilien Sébastien Foy (général de division)

 Fr 

 Jean-Louis de Franc d'Anglure (général de division)
 Jean-Baptiste Francesqui (général de brigade)
 Bernard-Georges-François Frère (général de division)
 François Antoine Freire-Pego (général de brigade)
 Maurice Ignace Fresia, baron d'Oglianico (général de division)
 Philibert Fressinet (général de division)
 André Bruno de Frévol de Lacoste (général de brigade)
 Gomez Freyre (général de division)
 François Xavier Jacob Freytag (général de division)
 Louis Friant (général de division)
 Jean Parfait Friederichs (général de division)
 Maurice Frimont (général de brigade)
 François Nicolas Fririon (général de division)
 Joseph François Fririon (général de brigade)
 Jean Froissard (general) (général de brigade)
 Jacques Pierre Fromentin (général de division)
 Jean Georges Fruhinsholz (général de brigade)
 Jean Urbain Fugière (général de brigade)
 Louis Auguste Fulcher de Monistrol (général de brigade)
 Henri de Fulque, comte d'Oraison (général de brigade)
 Pierre Fureau de Villemalet (général de division)
 Henri Guillaume de Furstemberg (général de brigade)
 Louis Fuzier (général de brigade)
 Jean Lambert Joseph Fyon (général de brigade)

 G 

 Jean Edmé François Gachet de Sainte-Suzanne (général de brigade)
 François Thomas Galbaud-Dufort (général de brigade)
 Anne Jacques Jean Louis Galdemar (général de brigade)
 Antoine Pierre Gallois (général de brigade)
 Jean Hugues Gambin (général de brigade)
 Honoré Joseph Antoine Ganteaume (Amiral)
 Marie Théodore Urbain Garbé (général de division)
 Charles Mathieu Gardanne (général de brigade)
 Gaspard Amédée Gardanne (général de division)
 Jean Garderat (général de brigade)
 Louis Gareau (général de brigade)
 Pierre Dominique Garnier (général de division)
 Mathurin Gasnier (général de brigade)
 Joseph Gasquet (général de brigade)
 Jean-Jacques Basilien de Gassendi (général de brigade)
 Charles Louis Joseph de Gau de Fregeville (général de division)
 Jean-Henri-Guy-Nicolas de Frégeville, marquis de Grandval (général de division)
 Philibert Gaudet (général de brigade)
 Jean-Olivier Gaudin (général de brigade)
 Benjamin Gault, baron de Benneval (général de brigade)
 Paul Louis Gaultier de Kervéguen (général de division)
 Louis Marie Gaussart (général de brigade)
 Pierre Edmé Gautherin (général de division)
 Étienne Gauthier (général de brigade)
 Jean-Bernard Gauthier de Murnan (général de brigade)
 Jean-Joseph Gauthier (général de brigade)
 Jean-Pierre Gauthier (général de brigade)
 Nicolas Hyacinthe Gautier (général de brigade)
 André Marie Gautier de Montgeroult (général de brigade)
 Jean-Marie Gaspard Gauvilliers (général de division)
 Louis Gay (général de brigade)
 Louis Jean Gayault de Celon (général de brigade)
 Honoré Théodore Maxime Gazan de la Peyrière (général de division)
 Jean Michel Geither (général de brigade)
 Nicolas Louis Gelb (général de division)
 Louis Gelly (général de brigade)
 Claude Ursule Gency (général de division)
 Louis Thomas Gengoult (général de division)
 Alphonse Louis Gentil de Saint-Alphonse (général de division)
 Antoine Gentili (général de division)
 François-Joseph Gérard (général de division)
 Étienne Maurice Gérard (général de division)
 Jean-Charles Gerbous de La Grange (général de brigade)
 Maurice Gervais Joachim Geslin de Trémargat (général de brigade)
 Sébastien Charles Hubert de Gestas, marquis de Lespéroux (général de brigade)
 Gaspard Vincent Félix Giacomoni (général de division)
 André Gigaux (général de brigade)
 Jean-Philippe Gignious de Bernède (général de brigade)
 Jean Joseph Guillaume Marguerite Gilibert de Merlhiac (général de brigade)
 Jacques Laurent Gilly (général de division)
 Joseph Gilot (général de division)
 Pierre de Gimel de Tudeils (général de division)
 Jean-Baptiste Girard, duc de Ligny (général de division)
 Jean-Pierre Girard (général de brigade)
 Pierre Louis Pélagie Girard (général de brigade)
 Alexandre Louis Robert Girardin d'Ermenonville (général de division)
 Antoine Girardon (général de division)
 Jean-François Girardot (général de brigade)
 Antoine Giraud (général de brigade)
 Victor-Bonaventure Girod de Vienney (général de brigade)
 Jacques-Nicolas Gobert (général de division)
 Martin Charles Gobrecht (général de division)
 Roch Godart (général de brigade)
 Nicolas Godinot (général de division)
 Jean-Claude Goffard (général de brigade)
 Jacques Gilles Henri Goguet (général de division)
 Louis Antoine Vast Vite Goguet (général de brigade)
 Nicolas François Thérèse Gondallier de Tugny (général de brigade)
 Armand Louis de Gontaut-Biron (général de division)
 Jérôme Joseph Goris (général de brigade)
 François Claude Gosse (général de brigade)
 Jean-Florimond Gougelot (général de brigade)
 Cybard Florimond Gouguet (général de brigade)
 François Goullus (général de brigade)
 Louis Anne Marie Gouré de Villemontée, (général de brigade)
 Gaspard Gourgaud (général de division)
 Auguste Étienne Marie Gourlez, baron de Lamotte (général de division)
 Louis Jean-Baptiste Gouvion (général de division)
 Jean-Baptiste Gouvion (général de brigade)
 Laurent de Gouvion-Saint-Cyr (Maréchal d'Empire)
 Louis-Marthe de Gouy d'Arsy, marquis d'Arsy (général de brigade)
 Jean François Graindorge (général de brigade)
 Louis Joseph Grandeau, baron d'Abancourt (général de division)
 Charles Louis Dieudonné Grandjean (général de division)
 Balthazard Grandjean (général de brigade)
 Jean Sébastien Grandjean (général de brigade)
 Jean Grangeret (général de brigade)
 Charles Grangier de la Ferrière (général de brigade)
 François-Joseph de Gratet, vicomte du Bouchage (général de division)
 Pierre Guillaume Gratien (général de division)
 Pierre Marie de Grave (général de division)
 Jean Georges Grenier (général de brigade)
 Paul Grenier (général de division)
 François Joseph Fidèle Gressot (général de brigade)
 Pierre Joseph Bérardier Grézieu (général de brigade)
 Louis Grignon (général de brigade)
 Achille Claude Marie Tocip Grigny (général de brigade)
 Rémy Grillot (général de brigade)
 Nicolas Louis-Auguste de Grimoard de Beauvoir du Roure de Beaumont, comte de Brison (général de brigade)
 Philippe Henri de Grimoard (général de division)
 Pierre André Grobon (général de brigade)
 Joseph Groisne (général de brigade)
 Jean Gaston Quentin Gromard (général de division)
 Jean Louis Gros (général de brigade)
 Emmanuel de Grouchy, Marquis de Grouchy (Maréchal d'Empire)
 François Grouvel (général de division)
 Nicolas Gruardet (général de brigade)
 Louis Sébastien Grundler (général de division)
 Antoine Gruyer (général de brigade)
 Pierre César Gudin des Bardelières (général de division)
 Charles Étienne Gudin de la Sablonnière (général de division)
 Charles Louis Joseph Olivier Gueheneuc (général de division)
 Louis Charles de Guénand (général de brigade)
 François Guérin d'Etoquigny (général de division)
 Jacques Julien Guérin, baron de Wald Erbach (général de brigade)
 Nicolas Louis Guériot de Saint-Martin (général de brigade)
 Jean-Louis Charles Victor Guesnon-Deschamps (général de brigade)
 Pierre Gueydan (général de brigade)
 Emmanuel Maximilien-Joseph Guidal (général de brigade)
 Jean Joseph Guieu (général de division)
 Joseph Guillaume (général de brigade)
 Paul Guillaume (général de brigade)
 Frédéric François Guillaume de Vaudoncourt (général de brigade)
 Jean-Pierre Guillemet (général de brigade)
 Armand Charles Guilleminot (général de division)
 Pierre-Joseph Guillet (général de brigade)
 François Gilles Guillot (général de brigade)
 André Guinet (général de brigade)
 Nicolas Bernard Guiot de Lacour (général de division)
 Jean Guiot du Repaire (général de brigade)
 Georges Guiscard de Bar (général de brigade)
 Marie Adrien François Guiton (général de brigade)
 Michel Guy (général de brigade)
 Pierre Jules César Guyardet (général de brigade)
 Nicolas Philippe Guye (général de brigade)
 Claude Raymond Guyon (général de brigade)
 François Alexis Guyonneau de Pambour (général de brigade)
 Claude-Étienne Guyot (général de division)
 Étienne Guyot (général de brigade)

 H 

 Pierre-Joseph Habert (général de division)
 Jean-Baptiste Charles Hallot (général de division)
 Christian Joseph Hammel (général de brigade)
 Antoine Alexandre Hanicque (général de division)
 François Hanriot (général de division)
 Honoré Alexandre Hacquin (général de division)
 Louis François Alexandre d'Harambure (général de division)
 Jean Hardy (général de division)
 Joseph Étienne Timoléon d'Hargenvilliers (général de brigade)
 Jean Isidore Harispe (maréchal de France)
 Louis Harlet (général de brigade)
 Olivier Harty, baron de Pierrebourg (général de division)
 Louis Auguste Juvénal des Ursins d'Harville (général de division)
 Étienne d'Hastrel de Rivedoux (général de division)
 Jacques Maurice Hatry (général de division)
 François Joseph Hauser (général de brigade)
 Jean-Joseph Ange d'Hautpoul (général de division)
 François Nicolas Benoît Haxo (général de division)
 Nicolas Haxo (général de brigade)
 Pierre Nicolas Joseph Hazard (général de brigade)
 Jean Hector dit Legros (général de brigade)
 Gabriel Marie Joseph Théodore d'Hédouville (général de division)
 François Nivard Charles Joseph d'Hénin (général de division)
 Jean-François Hennequin (général de brigade)
 Charles Nicolas Antoine d'Hennezel de Valleroy (général de brigade)
 Jean-François Henriod (général de brigade)
 Christophe Henrion (général de brigade)
 Jean-Pierre Henri (général de brigade)
 Jean-Baptiste Herbin-Dessaux (général de division)
 Mathieu Herbin (général de brigade)
 Pantaléon Charles François du Trousset comte d'Héricourt (général de brigade)
 Jean-Baptiste Michel René Durand, baron d'Herville (général de brigade)
 Charles de Hesse-Rheinfels-Rotenburg (général de division)
 Claude Marie Hervo (général de brigade)
 Étienne Heudelet de Bierre (général de division)
 Ghisbert Martin Cort Heyligers (général de division)
 Louis Maximilien François Herman Hinnisdal de Fumal (général de brigade)
 Louis Lazare Hoche (général de division)
 Jean Nicolas Houchard (général de division)
 César Louis Marie François Ange d'Houdetot (général de division)
 Léonard Jean Aubry Huard de Saint-Aubin (général de brigade)
 Pierre Antoine François Huber (général de division)
 Jean-Baptiste Michel Antoine Huché (général de division)
 Charles-Angelique-Francois Huchet de la Bedoyere (maréchal de camp France (1815))
 Claude François-Xavier Hue-Laborde (général de brigade)
 Édouard Huet (général de brigade)
 Louis Pierre Huet (général de division)
 Joseph Léopold Sigisbert Hugo (général de division)
 Louis Huguet-Chataux (général de brigade)
 Jacques Dominique Huin (général de brigade)
 Pierre-Augustin Hulin (général de division)
 Étienne Hulot (général de division)
 François Louis Humbert (général de brigade)
 Jean-François Sylvestre Humbert (général de brigade)
 Jean Joseph Amable Humbert (général de brigade)
 Jean Nicolas Humbert de Fercourt (général de brigade)
 Pierre Antoine Husson (général de division)

 I 

 Jean Alexandre Ihler (général de division)
 Louis-Théobald Ihler (général de brigade)
 Sulpice Imbert de La Platière (général de brigade)
 Augustin Joseph Isambert (général de brigade)
 Charles Frédéric Louis Maurice, prince d'Isenbourg-Birstein (général de brigade)
 Pierre Ismert (général de brigade)

 J 

 Władysław Franciszek Jabłonowski, (général de brigade)
 Maximilien Henri Nicolas Jacob (général de brigade)
 Philippe Joseph Jacob (général de division)
 Philippe Antoine Jacob de Cordemoy (général de brigade)
 Augustin Jean-Baptiste Jacobé de Trigny (général de brigade)
 Jean-Baptiste Jacopin (général de brigade)
 Nicolas Jacquemard (général de brigade)
 Jean-Pierre Jacquet (général de brigade)
 Jean-Baptiste Jacquin (général de brigade)
 Charles Claude Jacquinot (général de division)
 Pierre Jadart du Merbion (général de division)
 François Jalras (général de brigade)
 Jean-Baptiste Auguste Marie Jamin, marquis de Bermuy (général de brigade)
 Jean-Baptiste Jamin (général de division)
 Jacques Félix Jan de La Hamelinaye, comte de La Hamelinaye (général de division)
 Jan Willem Janssens (général de division)
 Henri Antoine Jardon (général de brigade)
 Étienne Anatole Gédéon Jarry (général de brigade)
 François Jarry de Vrigny de La Villette (général de brigade)
 Arnail François, marquis de Jaucourt (général de division)
 Jacques Louis Jaucourt-Latour (général de brigade)
 Jean-Baptiste Jeanin (général de division)
 Louis François Jeannet (général de brigade)
 Jean-Louis Jenin (général de brigade)
 Charles Edward Jennings de Kilmaine (général de division)
 Dominique Joba (général de brigade)
 Étienne Joly (général de brigade)
 Thomas Joly (général de brigade)
 Jacques Jomard (général de brigade)
 Antoine-Henri de Jomini (général de brigade)
 Nicolas Louis Jordy (général de division)
 Jean-Louis Gaspard Josnet de Laviolais (général de brigade)
 Jacques Casimir Jouan (général de brigade)
 Barthélemy Catherine Joubert (général de division)
 Joseph Antoine René Joubert (général de brigade)
 Pierre Joseph Joubert de La Salette (général de brigade)
 Jean-Pierre de Jouffroy (général de brigade)
 Jean-Baptiste Jourdan (Maréchal d'Empire)
 Auguste Jubé de La Perelle (général de brigade)
 Joseph François Bénigne Julhien (général de brigade)
 Louis Joseph Victor Jullien de Bidon (général de division)
 Jean-Marie Jumel (général de brigade)
 Jean-Andoche Junot (général de division)
 Louis Charles de Jurgy de La Varenne (général de brigade)

 K 

 Thomas Keating (général de division)
 François Christophe de Kellermann, duc de Valmy (Maréchal d'Empire)
 François Étienne de Kellermann (général de division)
 Jean-Jacques Kessel (général de brigade)
 Jean de Kindelan (général de division)
 François Joseph Kirgener, baron de Planta (général de division)
 Georges Kister, baron (général de brigade) 
 Jean-Baptiste Kléber (général de division)
 Louis Klein (général de division)
 Stanislas Klicki, baron (général de brigade)
 Karol Kniaziewicz (général de brigade)
 Jean Konopka (général de brigade)
 Wincenty Krasiński comte Wincenty Korwin-Krasiński (général de division)
 Corneille Rodolphe Théodore Krayenhoff (général de brigade)
 Jean Ernest Kriegg (général de division)

 L 

 La 

 Jean de Labadie (1719-1812) (général de brigade)
 André de La Barre (général de division)
 François Charles Labbé de Vouillers (général de brigade)
 François Garnier de Laboissière (général de brigade)
 Pierre Garnier de Laboissière (général de division)
 Anne François Augustin de La Bourdonnaye (général de division)
 André Adrien Joseph de La Bruyère (général de brigade)
 Étienne Chassin de La Bruyère (général de brigade)
 Jacques François Lachaise (général de brigade)
 Louis François Passerat de La Chapelle de Bellegarde (général de brigade)
 Claude Quentin de La Chiche (général de brigade)
 Jean-Pierre Lacombe-Saint-Michel (général de division)
 Jean Étienne Clément-Lacoste (général de brigade)
 Pierre Jean-Baptiste Lacoste de Fontenille (général de brigade)
 Jean Laurent Juslin de Lacoste-Duvivier (général de division)
 François Joseph Pamphile de Lacroix (général de division)
 Mathieu Lacroix (général de brigade)
 Jean-Gérard Lacuée, count of Cessac (général de division)
 Joseph Laczynski  de Łada (général de brigade)
 Barthélémy-Simon-François de La Farelle (général de brigade)
 Marie Joseph Paul Roch Gilbert Motier, marquis de La Fayette (général en chef)
 Louis Marie Levesque de Laferrière (général de division)
 Justin Laffite (général de brigade)
 Michel Pascal Lafitte (général de brigade)
 André-Joseph Lafitte-Clavé (général de brigade)
 Guillaume Joseph Nicolas de Lafon-Blaniac (général de division)
 Elie Lafont (général de brigade)
 Jacques Mathurin Lafosse (général de brigade)
 Henri-Jacques Martin de Lagarde (général de brigade)
 Joseph Lagrange (général de division)
 Amédée Emmanuel François Laharpe (général de division)
 Armand Lebrun de La Houssaye (général de division)
 Louis Joseph Lahure (général de division)
 Frédéric Michel François Joseph de Lajolais (général de brigade)
 Charles Eugène de Lalaing d'Audenarde (général de division)
 Alexandre Lalance (général de brigade)
 Jean Lalanne (général de brigade)
 Charles Lallemand (général de division)
 Henri Dominique Lallemand (général de division)
 Joseph Théodore Gabriel Lallemand de Waites (général de brigade)
 François Joseph Drouot de Lamarche (général de division)
 Antoine Nicolas Collier de La Marlière (ou Lamarlière) (général de division)
 Jean-Baptiste Théodore Lamarque d'Arrouzat (général de brigade)
 Jean Maximilien Lamarque (général de division)
 Henri François Lambert (général de brigade)
 Urbain François Lambert (général de brigade)
 Charles Pierre de Lamer (général de division)
 Alexandre Théodore Victor de Lameth (général de division)
 Charles Malo de Lameth (général de brigade)
 Etienne François Rocbert de Lamorendière-Ducoudray (général de brigade)
 Louis Charles de La Motte-Ango de Flers, vicomte de Flers (général de division)
 Pierre François Lambert Lamoureux de la Gennetière (général de division)
 Jean-Baptiste Lamouroux de La Roque-Cusson (général de brigade)
 Louis Augustin Lamy d'Hangest (général de division)
 Charles François Joseph de Lamy (général de brigade)
 Jean-Joseph Lamy de Boisconteau (général de brigade)
 Jean Pierre Lanabère (général de brigade)
 Louis François Lanchantin (général de brigade)
 Charles Hyacinthe Leclerc de Landremont (général de division)
 Jean-Noël Landrin (général de division)
 Gaspard Louis Langeron (général de brigade)
 Denis Jean Florimond Langlois de Mautheville, marquis du Bouchet (général de division)
 Jean Lannes, duc de Montebello (Maréchal d'Empire)
 René Joseph de Lanoue (général de division)
 Marin Guéroult Lapalière (général de brigade)
 François Lanusse (général de division)
 Pierre Lanusse (général de division)
 Pierre Belon Lapisse baron de Sainte-Hélène (général de division)
 Jean-Baptiste Antoine Laplanche (général de brigade)
 Claude Joseph de Laplanche-Morthières (général de brigade)
 Jean Grégoire Barthélemy Rouger de Laplane (général de division)

 Jean François Cornu de La Poype (général de division)
 Pierre Laprun (général de division)
 Toussaint Joseph de Lardemelle (général de brigade)
 Jean Ambroise Baston de Lariboisière (général de division)
 François Laroche (général de brigade)
 Antoine Laroche-Dubouscat (général de division)
 François XII Alexandre Frédéric de La Rochefoucauld, duc d'Estissac et duc de Liancourt (général de division)
 Philippe Ambroise Denis Laronde (général de division)
 Jean Alexandre Durand de La Roque (général de division)
 Jean-Louis de La Roque (général de brigade)
 Jean Baptiste Larroque (général de brigade)
 Jean La Sabatie (général de brigade)
 Jean Jacques Bernardin Colaud de La Salcette (général de division)
 Antoine Charles Louis de Lasalle (général de division)
 Jean Charlemagne Maynier, comte de La Salle (général de brigade)
 François Lassalle-Cezeau (général de brigade)
 François de Lastic (général de division)
 Pierre François Lataye (général de brigade)
 Jean-Jacques de Laterrade (général de brigade)
 Antoine Henri Armand Jules Elisabeth de Latour-Foissac (général de division)
 François Philippe de Latour-Foissac (général de division)
 Henri Joseph Vincent Latour (général de brigade)
 Joseph Latour (général de brigade)
 Juste-Charles de Fay de La Tour-Maubourg (général de division)
 Victor de Fay de La Tour-Maubourg (général de division)
 Guillaume Latrille de Lorencez (général de division)
 Pierre Marie du Lau d'Allemans (général de division)
 Germain Félix Tennet de Laubadère (général de division)
 Joseph Marie Tennet de Laubadère (général de division)
 Louis-François-Bertrand du Pont d'Aubevoye de Lauberdière (général de division)
 Jean-Baptiste Lauer (général de brigade)
 Jean-Baptiste de Laumoy (général de brigade)
 Michel de Laumur (général de brigade)
 Jean Aulay de Launay (général de division)
 François Guillaume Barthélémy Laurent (général de division)
 Jacques Lauriston (maréchal de France)
 Anne Gilbert de Laval (général de division)
 Louis Jean Baptiste de Lavalette (général de brigade)
 Jean-Pierre Marie Lavalette du Verdier (général de brigade)
 Joseph Alexandre Félix Marie de Laville (général de brigade)
 Gaëtan Joseph Prosper César de Laville de Villa-Stellone (général de brigade)
 Ferdinand de La Ville-sur-Illon (général de brigade, Royaume de Westphalie)
 Joseph Félix de Lazowski (général de brigade)

 Le 

 Antoine Joseph Claude Le Bel (général de brigade)
 Paul Alexandre Leblanc-Delisle (général de brigade)
 Claude Marie Lebley (général de brigade)
 Louis Vincent Joseph Leblond, comte de Saint Hilaire (général de division)
 Léonard Lebondidier (général de brigade)
 Anne Charles Lebrun, duc de Plaisance (général de division)
 François Léon Lebrun (général de brigade)
 Jacques Lecapitaine (général de brigade)
 François-Joseph Lecat (général de brigade)
 Jean Léchelle (général de division)
 Joseph (Giuseppe) Lechi (général de division)
 Théodore François Joseph Leclaire (général de brigade)
 Louis Nicolas Marin Leclerc des Essarts (général de division)
 Pierre Leclerc d'Ostein (général de brigade)
 Charles Victoire Emmanuel Leclerc (général de division)
 Jean-Baptiste Sébastien Le Comte (général de brigade)
 René François Lecomte (général de brigade)
 Claude Jacques Lecourbe (général de division)
 Robert Antoine Marie Lecousturier, vicomte d'Armenonville (général de brigade)
 Joseph Thomas Ledée (général de brigade)
 Pierre Eléonore Le Dieu de Ville (général de brigade)
 Jean-Denis Le Doyen (général de brigade)
 François Roch Ledru des Essarts (général de division)
 François Joseph Lefebvre, duc de Dantzig (Maréchal d'Empire)
 Marie Xavier Joseph Lefebvre, comte de Dantzig (général de brigade)
 Simon Lefebvre (général de brigade)
 Jacques Henri François Lefebvre de Ladonchamp (général de brigade)
 Charles Lefebvre-Desnouettes (général de division)
 Louis Hyacinthe Le Feron (général de brigade)
 Étienne Nicolas Lefol (général de division)
 Charles Auguste Philippe Lefort (général de brigade)
 Frédéric Antoine Henri Lefort (général de brigade)
 Jacques Lefranc (général de brigade)
 François Marie Guillaume Legendre d'Harvesse (général de brigade)
 Pierre Joseph Légier (général de brigade)
 Pierre Léglise (général de brigade)
 Claude Juste Alexandre Legrand (général de division)
 Étienne Legrand, baron de Mercey (général de division)
 Louis Melchior Legrand (général de brigade)
 Maximin Legros (général de brigade)
 François-Joseph Leguay (général de brigade)
 François Leigonyer (général de brigade)
 Louis-François Lejeune (général de brigade)
 Adélaïde Blaise François Le Lièvre, marquis de La Grange et de Fourilles (général de division)
 Armand Charles Louis Le Lièvre de La Grange, comte de La Grange (général de division)
 André Joseph Lemaire (général de division)
 Jean Léonor François Le Marois (général de division)
 Louis Lemoine (général de division)
 Louis René Le Mouton de Boisdeffre (général de brigade)
 Marc-Antoine Lemoyne (général de brigade)
 Charles Philibert de Lenglentier (général de division)
 Auguste Nicolas Lenoir (général de brigade)
 Michel Étienne François Lenoir de La Cochetière (général de brigade)
 Henri Marie Lenoury (général de division)
 Joseph Placide Alexandre Léorier (général de brigade)
 Jean-François Lepaige (général de brigade)
 Guillaume Lepéduchelle (général de brigade)
 Louis Lepic (général de division)
 Pierre Henri Lepin (général de division)
 Joseph François Antoine Gabriel Lépine (général de brigade)
 Louis Lequoy (général de division)
 Albert Auguste Le Ris de La Chapelette (général de brigade)
 Gabriel Jacques Lerivint (général de brigade)
 Joseph Hervé Jean Le Roy de Préval (général de brigade)
 Charles Louis Joseph de L'Escuyer, marquis d'Hagnicourt (général de brigade)
 Georges Hippolyte Le Sénécal (général de brigade)
 Louis Jean-Baptiste Leseur (général de brigade)
 Augustin de Lespinasse (général de division)
 Claude Aimable Vincent de Roqueplant de L'Estrade (général de division)
 Joseph Mathurin Fidèle Lesuire, baron de Bizy (général de brigade)
 Henri Letellier (général de brigade)
 Louis Michel Letort (général de division)
 François-Joseph Alexandre Letourneur (général de brigade)
 François Louis Honoré Le Tourneur (général de brigade)
 Jean François Leval (général de division)
 Victor Levasseur, (général de brigade)
 Joachim Joseph Levasseur de Neuilly (général de brigade)
 Pierre Léon Levavasseur (général de division)
 Jean Pierre Baptiste L'Eveillé (général de brigade)
 Alexis Paul Michel Le Veneur de Tillières, comte d'Empire (général de division)
 Joseph Marie Levie (général de brigade)
 Joseph Placide Alexandre Levrier (général de division)

 Lh - Li 

 Pierre François Lhermitte d'Aubigny (général de brigade)
 Samuel-François Lhéritier (général de division)
 François Lhuillier de Hoff (général de division)
 Charles Antoine Liébault (général de brigade)
 Jean Jacques Liébert baron de Nitray (général de division)
 François Liégard (général de brigade)
 Louis Liger-Belair (général de division)
 René Charles Élisabeth de Ligniville (l'Arc indique Ligneville) (général de division)
 Jean Dieudonné Lion (général de division)
 Pierre Gaston Henri de Livron (général de brigade)

 Lo 

 Pierre-Charles Lochet (général de brigade)
 Odon Nicolas Loeillot Demars (général de brigade)
 Louis Henri Loison (général de division)
 Antoine de Sagne de Lombard (général de division)
 Louis Lonchamp (général de brigade)
 Jean-Baptiste de Lorcet (général de brigade)
 Jean Thomas Guillaume Lorge (général de division)
 Jean-Claude Loubat de Bohan (général de brigade)
 Nicolas de Loverdo (général de division)

 Lu 

 Tomasz Łubieński (général de brigade)
 Nicolas de Luckner (maréchal de France)
 Edme Aimé Lucotte (général de division)
 Denis-Éloi Ludot (général de brigade)
 Isidore Lynch (général de division)

 M 

 Ma 

 Jacques MacDonald, duc de Tarente (Maréchal d'Empire)
 Pierre Macon (général de brigade)
 François Antoine Joseph Nicolas Macors (général de division)
 François Macquard (général de division)
 Alexis Magallon de la Morlière (général de division)
 François-Louis Magallon de la Morlière (général de division)
 Joseph Antoine Marie Michel Mainoni (général de brigade)
 Simon Hubert Maire (général de brigade)
 Nicolas Joseph Maison (Maréchal de France)
 Philippe Joseph Malbrancq (général de brigade)
 Claude François de Malet (général de brigade)
 Pierre Antoine Anselme Malet (général de brigade)
 Jean-Pierre Firmin Malher (général de division)
 Marc Antoine Malleret, baron de Verteuil de Malleret (général de division)
 François Théobald de Maltzan (général de brigade)
 Étienne Bernard Malye (général de brigade)
 Eugène Charles Auguste David de Mandeville (général de brigade)
 Jean-Baptiste Mangin-Doins (général de brigade)
 Charles Antoine Manhès (général de division)
 Joseph-Yves Manigault-Gaulois (général de brigade)
 Jean-Baptiste Félix de Manscourt du Rozoy (général de brigade)
 Jacques Charles de Manson (général de brigade)
 Jean-Pierre Maransin (général de division)
 Jean René Paul Blandine de Marassé (général de division)
 Jean-Antoine Marbot (général de division)
 Marcellin Marbot (général de brigade)
 Louis Henri François de Marcé (général de division)
 François-Séverin Marceau-Desgraviers (général de division) 
 Edmé Pierre Louis Marchais (général de brigade)
 Jean Gabriel Marchand (général de division)
 Louis Thomas Marchant (général de brigade)
 Théodore Melchior Marchant (général de brigade)
 Mathieu Henri Marchant de La Houlière (général de division)
 Louis Marès (général de brigade)
 Armand Samuel de Marescot (général de division)
 Pierre Margaron (général de division)
 Jacques Philippe de Marguenat (général de brigade)
 Jean Joseph Marguet (général de brigade)
 Louis Auguste François Mariage (général de brigade)
 Jean-Baptiste Simon Etienne Marie, vicomte de Fréhaut (général de brigade)
 Jean Fortuné Boüin de Marigny (général de brigade)
 Jacques-Barthélémy Marin (général de brigade)
 Charles Stanislas Marion (général de brigade)
 Frédéric Christophe Henri Pierre Claude Vagnair (général de brigade)
 Auguste de Marmont, duc de Raguse (Maréchal d'Empire)
 Jacob François Marulaz (général de division)
 Philippe André Martel (général de brigade)
 Charles Pascalis de Martignac (général de division)
 Pierre Martillière (général de brigade)
 Joseph Magdelaine Martin (général de brigade)
 Georges Alexandre Martuschewitz de Labedz (général de brigade)
 Ferdinand Daniel Marx (général de brigade)
 Jean-Baptiste Charles René Joseph du Mas de Polart (général de division)
 André Masséna, duc de Rivoli, prince d'Essling (Maréchal d'Empire)
 Jean de Massia (général de brigade)
 Honoré Louis Auguste Massol de Monteil (général de division)
 Jean Augustin Masson (général de brigade)
 Pierre Mataly de Maran, (général de brigade)
 Joseph Matenot (général de brigade)
 Jean-Baptiste Martial Materre (général de brigade)
 Jean Nicolas Éloi Mathis (général de brigade)
 Jean Mauco (général de division)
 Jean-François Nicolas Joseph Maucomble (général de brigade)
 Pierre Adrien de Maudet (général de division)
 Antoine Maugras (général de brigade)
 Emmanuel Gabriel de Maulde (général de brigade)
 François Maulmond (général de brigade)
 Pierre Honoré Anne Maupetit (général de brigade)
 Louis Joseph Maupoint, baron de Vandeul (général de brigade)
 Anne-Joseph-Hippolyte de Maurès de Malartic, comte de Malartic (général de division)
 Nicolas Maurice (général de brigade)
 Antoine Maurin (général de division)
 Denis Joseph De Mauroy (général de brigade)
 Henry Maury (général de brigade)
 Jean Adam Mayer (général de brigade)
 Joseph Sébastien Mayer (général de brigade)
 Étienne Maynaud de Bizefranc de Laveaux (général de division)

Me 

 Charles Marc Louis de Mellet (général de brigade)
 Antoine Menant (général de brigade)
 Philippe Romain Ménard (général de division)
 Jean-François Xavier de Ménard (général de division)
 François Xavier de Mengaud (général de division)
 Jean-Baptiste Pierre Menne (général de division)
 Jacques-François Menou, baron de Boussay (général de division)
 Charles-Nicolas Méquillet (général de division)
 Jean Nicolas Méquillet (général de division)
 Pierre Hugues Victoire Merle (général de division)
 Pierre Nicolas Merle-Beaulieu (général de brigade)
 Christophe Antoine Merlin (général de division)
 Antoine François Eugène Merlin (général de division)
 Jean-Baptiste Gabriel Merlin (général de brigade)
 Julien Augustin Joseph Mermet (général de division)
 Antoine Mermet de Saint-Landry (général de brigade)
 Jean Mesclop (général de brigade)
 Jacques Mesnage (général de brigade)
 Benoît Meunier, baron de Saint-Clair (général de division)
 Claude Marie Meunier (général de division)
 Hugues Alexandre Joseph Meunier (général de division)
 Hugues Meunier (général de brigade)
 Jean-Baptiste Marie Meusnier de la Place (général de division)
 Charles-Claude Meuziau (général de division)
 Pierre Arnould Meyer (général de division)
 Jean-Baptiste Maur Ange Montanus Joseph Rodolphe Eugène Meyer (général de brigade)
 Bernard Meinrad Frédalin Joseph Philippe Nérée Jean-Baptiste Meyer de Schauensée (général de brigade)
 Louis Henri René Meynadier (général de division)
 Jean-Baptiste Meynier (général de division)

Mi 

 Joseph de Miaczynski (général de brigade)
 Jean-François Micas (général de division)
 Claude Ignace François Michaud (général de division)
 Jean Le Michaud d'Arçon
 Pierre Antoine Michaud (général de division)
 Antoine Michaux (général de brigade)
 Claude-Étienne Michel (général de division)
 Jean-Baptiste Pierre Michel (général de brigade)
 Jean Bernard Michel de Bellecour (général de division)
 Jean Quirin de Mieszkowski (général de brigade)
 Thomas Mignot, baron de Lamartinière (général de division)
 Joseph Mignotte (général de brigade)
 Jacques Louis François Milet (général de brigade)
 Louis Marie Antoine Milet de Mureau, baron de Destouff (général de division)
 Jean-Antoine Leclerc de Milfort (général de brigade)
 Édouard Jean Baptiste Milhaud (général de division)
 Théodore François Millet (général de brigade)
 Armand Louis Amélie Millet de Villeneuve (général de division)
 Jean-Michel Alexandre de Millo (général de brigade)
 Jean-Louis Toussaint Minot (général de brigade)
 Balthazar de Miollis (général de brigade)
 Sextius Alexandre François de Miollis (général de division)
 Pierre André Miquel (général de brigade)
 Guillaume Mirabel (général de brigade)
 Francisco de Miranda (général de division)
 Antoine René de Mirondel (général de brigade)
 François Mireur (général de brigade)

Mo 

 Georges Alexis Mocquery (général de division)
 Jean-Baptiste Molette, baron de Morangiès (général de brigade)
 Gabriel Jean Joseph Molitor, (Maréchal de France)
 Jean Nicolas de Monard (général de brigade)
 Bon-Adrien Jeannot de Moncey, duc de Conegliano (Maréchal d'Empire)
 Georges Monet (général de brigade)
   John Money (général de brigade)
 François Bernard de Mongenet (général de brigade)
 André Monleau (général de brigade)
 Louis Claude Monnet de Lorbeau (général de division)
 Jean-Charles Monnier (général de division)
 René Nicolas Monnier (général de division)
 Marie Pierre Hypolithe Monnyer de Prilly (général de brigade)
 Joseph Monroux (général de brigade)
 Marc-René de Montalembert (général de division)
 Alexandre de Montbrun (général de brigade)
 Louis-Pierre Montbrun (général de division)
 Gabriel Gaspard Achille Adolphe Bernon de Montélégier (général de brigade)
 Jean Étienne François Monter (général de brigade)
 Anne Pierre de Montesquiou, marquis de Montesquiou-Fézensac (général de division)
 Raymond Aymeric Philippe Joseph de Montesquiou, duc de Montesquiou-Fézensac (général de division)
 Philippe André François de Montesquiou-Marsan, comte de Montesquiou-Fézensac (général de division)
 Jean Montfalcon (général de division)
 Jacques de Montfort (général de brigade)
 Charles Tristan de Montholon-Sémonville (général de brigade)
 Louis-Adrien Brice De Montigny (général de division)
 Mathieu Paul Louis de Montmorency-Laval, vicomte de Laval (général de brigade)
 Joseph Louis François Hyacinthe de Montredon (général de division)
 Charles Antoine Morand (général de division)
 Joseph Morand (général de division)
 Pierre Morand du Puch aîné chevalier de Grangeneuve (général de division)
 Pierre Morand du Puch cadet, chevalier Morand du Puch et de l'Empire (général de brigade)
 Charles Morard de La Bayette de Galles (général de division)
 Jean-Claude Moreau (général de brigade)
 Jean Victor Marie Moreau (général de division)
 Jean René Moreaux (général de division)
 Denis Jacques de Moret seigneur du Jalet (général de brigade)
 Jacques Aimard de Moreton de Chabrillant (général de division)
 Jacques Henri Sébastien César Moreton Chabrillant (maréchal de camp)
 Joseph Dominique de Chabrillan (général de brigade)
 Jacques-Polycarpe Morgan (général de division)
 Jean-Baptiste Louis Morin (général de brigade)
 Pierre-Nicolas Morin (général de brigade)
 Annet Morio de L'Isle (général de brigade)
 Joseph Antoine Morio de Marienborn (général de division)
 Antoine Morlot (général de division)
 Ange-Pierre Moroni (général de brigade)
 Édouard Mortier, duc de Trévise (Maréchal d'Empire)
 Jean-Louis Olivier Mossel (général de division)
 Robert Motte (général de brigade)
 Jean-Baptiste Moulin (général de brigade)
 Jean-François Moulin (général de division)
 André Mouret (général de division)
 Pierre Mourier (général de brigade)
 Barthélémy François Mousin (général de division)
 Georges Mouton, comte de Lobau (général de division)
 Régis Barthélemy Mouton-Duvernet (général de division)
 Jacques Nicolas Moynat d'Auxon (général de brigade)

Mu 

 François Muller (général de division)
 Jacques Léonard Muller (général de division)
 Louis Dominique Munnier (général de division)
 Joachim Murat, Grand Duke of Berg and Clèves, King of Naples (Maréchal d'Empire)
 David Maurice de Barreau-Champoulies de Muratel (général de brigade)
 Jean-Bernard Gauthier de Murnan (général de brigade)
 Benoît Pierre Charles de Musino, comte du Hamel (général de division)
 Louis François Félix Musnier (général de division)
 Jean-Charles Musquinet de Beaupré (général de brigade)
 Jean Baptiste de Félix du Muy, comte de Saint-Maime et du Muy, (général de division)
 Ernest Albert Henri de Lubicz-Mylius (général de brigade)

N 

 Henri Nadot-Fontenay (général de division)
 Thomas-Patrice Nagle (général de brigade)
 Étienne Marie Antoine Champion Nansouty (général de division)
 James Napper Tandy (général de brigade)
 Louis Marie Jacques Almaric de Narbonne Lara (général de division)
 Alexandre-Pierre Navelet de La Massonnière (général de brigade)
 Étienne Henri Christophe Nayrod (général de brigade)
 Gabriel Neigre (général de division)
 Pierre-Michel Nempde-Dupoyet (général de brigade)
 Emmanuel Michel Bertrand Gaspard Neuhaus (général de division)
 Joachim Joseph Neuilly (général de brigade)
 Joseph Victorin Nevinger (général de division)
 Michel Ney, duc d'Elchingen, prince de la Moskova (Maréchal d'Empire)
 Jean Nicolas (général de brigade)
 Louis-Marie de Noailles (général de brigade)
 Pierre Noël (général de brigade)
 Antoine Noguès (général de brigade)
 Jean-François Xavier Noguès (général de division) frère du précédent;
 Jean-Baptiste Noirot (général de brigade)
 Jean-François Gaspard Normand (général de brigade)
 Henri Marie Lenoury (général de division)
 Jean-Baptiste Nouvion (général de brigade)
 Charles Joseph de Nozières d'Envezin, comte de Rosières (général de division)
 Léopold Anne-Marie Joseph de Nucé (général de brigade)

O 

 Marc Antoine Marie Obert (général de division)
 Arthur O'Connor (général de division)
 François-Joseph d'Offenstein (général de division (1793-1794) et général de brigade (1807-1816))
 Patrice O'Keeffe (général de brigade)
 André Louis Olagnier (général de division)
 Jean-Baptiste Olivié (général de division)
 Guillaume O'Meara (général de brigade)
 Thomas O'Meara, comte de Baane (général de brigade)
 Jacques O'Moran (général de division)
 Jean O'Neill (général de brigade)
 Louis Joseph Opsomer (général de brigade)
 Michel Ordener (général de division)
 Alexandre Ordioni (général de brigade)
 Louis Ordonneau (général de division)
 Philippe-Égalité, duc d'Orléans (général de division)
 Louis-Philippe d'Orléans (général de division)
 François Léon Ormancey (général de brigade)
 Jean Jacques de La Roque d'Olès d'Ornac (général de division)
 Philippe Antoine d'Ornano
 Eugène François Orsatelli (général de brigade)
 Jean-François Louis Marie Albert Grimod d'Orsay (général de division)
 David Ortlieb (général de brigade)
 Richard O'Shée (général de brigade)
 Christophe Ossvald (général de brigade)
 Pierre-Jacques Osten (général de brigade)
 Jacques Philippe Ottavi (général de brigade)
 Raymond César Oubxet (général de brigade)
 Nicolas Oudinot, duc de Reggio (Maréchal d'Empire)
 Ignace Laurent Joseph Stanislas d'Oullenbourg (général de division)
 Hendrick Jan van Oyen (1771–1850) (général de brigade)

P

Pa 

 Louis Michel Pac de Gozdawa (général de division)
 Michel Marie Pacthod (général de division)
 François Marie Sébastien Pageot (général de division)
 Joseph Pagès (général de brigade)
 Joseph Paignat (général de division)
 Pierre Claude Pajol (général de division)
 Nicolas Augustin Paliard (général de brigade)
 François Joseph Antoine Bertrand de Palmarole (général de brigade)
 Henri Dominique Marius de Palys (général de brigade)
 Emmanuel Ignace Pamplona (général de division)
 Claude Marie Joseph Pannetier, comte de Valdotte (général de division)
 Pasquale Paoli (général de division)
 Claude Étienne Paquin de Vauzlemont (général de brigade)
 Joseph Paradis (général de brigade)
 Barthélémy Étienne Parant (général de brigade)
 Pierre-Mathieu Parein du Mesnil (général de brigade)
 Marie Auguste Paris (général de division)
 Antoine Marie Paris d'Illins (général de brigade)
 Thomas Camille Gaëtan Paroletti (général de brigade)
 François Parra (général de brigade)
 Louis Partouneaux (général de division)
 François Nicolas Pascal de Kerenveyer (général de division)
 Joseph Sécret Pascal-Vallongue (général de brigade)
 Eustache Hubert Passinges, chevalier de Préchamps (général de brigade)
 Yves Marie Pastol, baron de Kéramelin (général de brigade)
 Philippe Joseph Patel (général de brigade)
 Marc Gaspard Abraham Paulet de La Bastide (général de brigade)
 Pierre Louis François Paultre de Lamotte (général de division)

Pe 

 Mathieu Péalardy (général de division)
 Marc Nicolas Louis Pécheux (général de division)
 Guillaume Alexandre Thomas Pégot (général de brigade)
 Jean Gaudens Claude Pégot (général de brigade)
 Jean-Jacques Germain Pelet-Clozeau (général de division)
 Jean-Louis Pellapra (général de division)
 Joseph Pellegrin de Millon (général de brigade)
 Pierre Pelleport (général de division)
 Aimé Sulpice Victor Pelletier, baron de Montmarie (général de brigade)
 Louis François Elie Pelletier, comte de Montmarie (général de division)
 Jean-Baptiste Pelletier (général de division)
 Louis Pelletier (général de brigade)
 Raymond Pierre Penne (général de brigade)
 Guglielmo Pepe (lieutenant général) 
 Joseph Pépin (général de brigade)
 Jean-Claude Pergaud (général de brigade)
 Bernard Peri (général de brigade)
 François-Marie Perichou de Kerversau (général de brigade)
 Catherine-Dominique de Pérignon (Maréchal d'Empire)
 Joseph Marie de Pernety (général de division)
 André Thomas Perreimond ou Pereymont (général de division)
 Joseph Perrin (général de brigade)
 Claude Victor-Perrin, Duc de Belluno (Maréchal d'Empire)
 Joseph Hélie Désiré Perruquet de Montrichard (général de division)
 Charles Bernard Joseph Percin, marquis de Montgaillard et de La Valette (général de brigade)
 César Pierre Pestalozzi (général de brigade)
 Paul Louis Joseph Peterinck (général de brigade)
 Augustin Louis Petiet (général de brigade)
 Claude Petit (général de brigade)
 Jean Martin Petit (général de division)
 Pierre Petitguillaume (général de division)
 François Petitjean (général de brigade)
 Pierre Étienne Petitot (général de brigade)
 Pierre Charles Petou-Desnoyers (général de brigade)
 André Pacifique Peyre (général de brigade)
 Louis Hippolyte Peyron (général de brigade)
 Armand Philippon (général de division)

Pi 

 Jean-Pierre Piat (général de brigade)
 Joseph-Denis Picard (général de division)
 Jean-Charles Pichegru (général de division)
 Étienne Guillaume Picot de Bazus (général de division)
 Cyrille Simon Picquet (général de division)
 Adrien Nicolas Piédefer, marquis de La Salle (général de brigade)
 Nicolas Pierquin (général de brigade)
 Jean Ignace Pierre (général de brigade)
 Elie Marie Pierron (général de division)
 Jean Joseph Magdeleine Pijon (général de brigade)
 Louis Antoine Pille (général de division)
 Jacques Marguerite Pilotte, baron de La Barolière (général de division)
 Jean Daniel Pinet de Borde-Desforêts (général de brigade)
 Jean Pinet de Saint-Naixent (général de brigade)
 Jean Simon Pierre Pinon (général de brigade)
 Agathon Pinot, chevalier du Petit-Bois (général de brigade)
 Pierre-Armand Pinoteau (général de brigade)
 Memmie Pinteville (général de brigade)
 Pierre Alexis de Pinteville (général de brigade)
 Alexandre Jean-Batiste Piochard, comte d'Arblay (général de division)
 Joseph Piston (général de division)
 Louis Jean Plaideux (général de brigade)
 Louis Auguste Marchand Plauzonne (général de brigade)
 Louis Augustin Plicque (général de brigade)

Po 

 Pierre Poinsot de Chansac (général de division)
 François Hilarion Point (général de brigade)
  (général de brigade)
 Jean Étienne Casimir Poitevin de Maureilhan (général de division)
 François René Jean de Pommereul (général de division)
 André Poncet (général de division)
 Antoine François Poncet de La Cour de Maupas (général de brigade)
 Józef Antoni Poniatowski, prince  (Maréchal d'Empire)
 Jean-Marie Ponsard (général de brigade)
 Antoine Louis Popon de Maucune (général de division)
 Paul-Jean-Baptiste Poret de Morvan (général de brigade)
 Jean-François Porson (général de brigade)
 Jean-Pierre Portschy (général de brigade)
 Étienne François Raymond Pouchelon (général de brigade)
 Pierre Guillaume Pouchin de la Roche (général de brigade)
 Jean Pierre Pouget (général de division)
 Bernard Pourailly (général de brigade)
 Charles Pierre Pourcin (général de brigade)
 Antoine Eléonor Pouthier de Gouhelans (général de brigade)
 Pierre Charles Pouzet, baron de Saint-Charles (général de brigade)

Pr 

 Jean André Praefke (général de brigade)
 Jean Charles Prestat (général de brigade)
 Claude Antoine Hippolyte de Préval (général de division)
 Pierre Dominique Prévost (général de brigade)
 Jean Étienne Philibert de Prez de Crassier (général de division)
 Claude Prost (général de brigade)
 Guillaume Marcelin Proteau (général de brigade)
 Jean Proteau (général de brigade)
 Gilbert Prudon (général de brigade)
 Ythier Silvain Pryvé (général de brigade)

Pu 

 Hilarion Paul Puget de Barbantane (général de division)
 Edmé Jean Antoine du Puget d'Orval (général de brigade)
 Charles Joseph Randon de Malboissière de Pully (général de division)
 Joseph Puniet de Montfort (général de brigade)
 Jacques-Pierre-Louis Puthod (général de division)

Q 

 Pierre Quantin (général de division)
 Paul Yves Bernard de Quélen de Stuer de Caussade, duc de La Vauguyon (général de division)
 François Jean Baptiste Quesnel (général de division)
 Jacques Quétard de La Porte (général de brigade)
 Pierre Quétineau (général de brigade)
 Mathieu Queunot (général de brigade)
 Gabriel Queyssat (général de brigade)
 Jean Charles Quinette de Cernay (général de brigade)
 Joachim Jérôme Quiot du Passage (général de division)

R

Ra 

 Charles Joseph Constantin Radermacher (général de brigade)
 Étienne Radet (général de division)
 Nicolas Raffet (général de brigade)
 François Rambeaud (général de brigade)
 Gabriel Pierre de Rambourgt (général de brigade)
 Jean-Pierre Ramel (général de brigade)
 Jean-Marie-Vital Ramey de Sugny (général de division)
 Antoine-Guillaume Rampon (général de division)
 Charles Joseph Randon de Malboissière, comte de Pully (général de division)
 Jean-Pierre de Ransonnet-Bosford (général de brigade)
 Charles-François Raoul (général de brigade)
 Marie Étienne de Raphélis, comte de Roquesante (général de brigade)
 Jean Rapp (général de division)
 Jean-François de Ravel de Puycontal (général de brigade)
 Jean-Baptiste Ambroise Ravier (général de brigade)
 Alexis Joseph Ravier de Jullière (général de brigade)
 Jean Nicolas Razout (général de division)

Re 

 Simon Recordon (général de brigade)
 Charles Christophe Joseph Louis Reding de Biberegg (général de brigade)
 Jean Joseph Édouard Reed (général de brigade)
 Alexandre de Rège, comte Gifflenga (général de division)
 Jean Louis Christophe Régnier (général de division)
 Pierre François Joseph Régnier (général de brigade)
 Honoré Charles Reille (général de division, maréchal de France)
 Marie Antoine de Reiset (général de division)
 Victor Urbain Rémond (général de brigade)
 Charles-François Remond (général de brigade)
 Brice Jean-Baptiste Renard (général de brigade)
 Antoine François Renaud (général de brigade)
 Jean Gaspard Pascal René (général de brigade)
 Michel Reneauld (général de division)
 Jean Charles Renouard (général de brigade)
 André de Resnier (général de brigade)
 André Guillaume Resnier de Goué (général de brigade)
 Henri Thomas Reubell (général de division)
 Jean-Jacques Reubell (général de brigade)
 Henri de Reuss-Schleiz (général de brigade)
  (général de brigade)
 Gabriel Venance Rey (général de division)
 Guillaume Rey (général de brigade)
 Jean-André Rey (général de brigade)
 Jean-Pierre-Antoine Rey (général de brigade)
 Louis Emmanuel Rey (général de division)
 Hilaire Benoît Reynaud (général de brigade)
 Nicolas Reynaud (général de brigade)
 Jean Reynier (général de division)
 Julien Charles Louis Rheinwald (général de brigade)

Ri 

 Nicolas Xavier de Ricard (général de brigade)
 Étienne Pierre Sylvestre Ricard (général de division)
 Gabriel Marie de Riccé (général de brigade)
 Joseph Léonard Richard (général de brigade)
 Jérôme Étienne Marie Richardot (général de brigade)
 Antoine Richepanse ou Richepanse, (général de division)
 Henri Richon (général de brigade)
 Jean-Louis Richter (général de division)
 Jean-Baptiste André Rifflet (général de brigade)
 Antoine Rigau ou Rigaux (général de brigade)
 André Rigaud (général de brigade)
 Antoine Rignoux (général de brigade)
 Archange Louis Rioult-Davenay (général de brigade)
 Jean-Marie Ritay (général de brigade)
 Jean Rivaud (général de division)
 Olivier Macoux Rivaud de la Raffinière (général de division)
 Pierre Emmanuel Jacques de Rivaz (général de brigade)
 Jean-Baptiste Rivet (général de brigade)

Ro 

 Jean-Baptiste Robert (général de division)
 Jean Gilles André Robert (général de brigade)
 Joseph Louis Armand Robert (général de division)
 Louis Benoît Robert (général de brigade)
 Simon Robert (général de brigade)
 Antoine Joseph Robin (général de division)
 Étienne François Rocbert, baron de Lamorendière-Ducoudray (général de brigade)
 Jean Marie Donatien de Vimeur de Rochambeau (général de division)
 Jean-François Rochedragon (général de brigade)
 Jean-Pierre-Maurice de Rochon (général de brigade)
 Emmanuel de Serviez, (général de brigade)
 Antoine Roest d'Alkemade (général de brigade)
 Jean-Baptiste Roger de Lacoustande (général de brigade)
 Dominique Mansuy Roget, baron de Belloguet (général de division)
 Joseph Rogniat (général de division)
 Louis Joseph Marie Rogon de Carcaradec (général de brigade)
 François Roguet (général de division)
 César Antoine Roize (général de brigade)
 Claude Roize (général de brigade)
 Jacques Roland (général de brigade)
 Pierre Jacques Nicolas Rolland (général de brigade)
 Balthazar Romand (général de brigade)
 Joseph Romanet, chevalier du Caillaud (général de brigade)
 Albert Marie de Romé (général de brigade)
 Jean-François Rome (général de brigade)
 Jacques Alexandre Romeuf (général de brigade)
 Jean Louis Romeuf (général de brigade)
 François Marie Clément de la Roncière (général de division)
 Charles Philippe Ronsin (général de division)
 Pierre François Gabriel Ronzier (général de brigade)
 Nicolas Roque (général de brigade)
 Paul Louis Antoine de Rosières (général de division)
 Hippolyte Marie Guillaume de Rosnyvinen, comte de Piré (général de division)
 Marie Joseph Thomas Rossetti (général de brigade)
 Don Gratio Rossi (général de brigade)
 Antoine François de Rossi (général de division)
 Camille de Rossi (général de division)
 Jean Antoine Rossignol (général de division)
 Philippe Joseph de Rostaing (général de division)
 Claude Rostollant (général de brigade)
 Henri Rottembourg (général de division)
 Pierre Rouché (général de division)
 Pierre-Michel Rouelle (général de brigade)
 Antoine Rougé (général de brigade)
 Jean Grégoire Barthélemy Rouger, baron de Laplane (général de division)
 Claude Pierre Rouget (général de brigade)
 Henri Victor Roulland (général de brigade)
 Guillaume Charles Rousseau (général de brigade)
 Antoine Alexandre Rousseaux (général de division)
 François Xavier Roussel (général de brigade)
 Jean Charles Roussel (général de brigade)
 Charles Alexandre Louis Roussel de Saint-Rémy (général de division)
 Nicolas-François Roussel d'Hurbal (général de division)
 Pierre Roux de Fazillac (général de brigade)
 Philibert François Rouxel de Blanchelande (général de brigade)
 Charles Étienne Rouyer (général de brigade)
 Jean-Pascal Rouyer (général de brigade)
 Jean Victor Rouyer, baron de Saint-Victor (général de brigade)
 Marie François Rouyer (général de division)
 Joseph Stanislas François Xavier Alexis de Rovère de Fontvielle (général de brigade)

Ru 

 Jean-Baptiste André Isidore Ruault de La Bonnerie (général de brigade)
 Sébastien Ruby (général de brigade)
 Louis Jacques Ruelle de Santerre (général de brigade)
 François Amable Ruffin (général de division)
 Jean-Baptiste Dominique Rusca (général de brigade)
 Ernest de Ruttemberg (général de brigade)
 Charles-Étienne-François Ruty (général de division)

S

Sa 

 Joseph François Claude de Sabardin (général de brigade)
 Bonaventure Hippolyte Sabatier (général de brigade)
 Jean Isaac Sabatier (général de brigade)
 Just Pasteur Sabatier (général de brigade)
 Christophe-Cortasse de Sablonet (général de brigade)
 Georges Philippe Saboureux de Fontenay (général de brigade)
 Jacques Henri de Sabrevois d'Oyenville (général de brigade)
 Louis Michel Antoine Sahuc (général de division)
 Jean Joseph François Léonard Sahuguet Damarzit de Laroche, ou d'Amarzit de Laroche (général de division)
 Mathieu Pierre Paul Saignes (général de brigade)
 Saint-Cyr Nugues (général de division)
 Gilbert Joseph Martin Bruneteto de Sainte-Suzanne (général de division)
 Jean Marie Noël Delisle de Falcon de Saint-Geniès (général de division)
 Charles Barthélemy de Saint-Fief (général de brigade)
 Antoine-Louis Decrest de Saint-Germain (général de division)
 Jean-Pierre Aaron Seimandy de Saint-Gervais (général de brigade)
 Louis-Vincent-Joseph Le Blond de Saint-Hilaire (général de division)
 Antoine Saint-Hillier (général de division)
 François Joseph de Saint-Jean, baron de Pointis (général de brigade)
 Louis Joseph Auguste Gabriel de Saint-Laurent (général de division)
 Alexis Saint-Martin (général de brigade)
 Jacques Louis Saint-Martin (général de brigade)
 Jean Étienne de Saint-Martin (général de brigade)
 David-Maurice-Joseph Mathieu de La Redorte (général de division)
 François-Houzé de Saint-Paul (général de brigade)
 Claude Marie de Saint-Quentin (général de brigade)
 Maurice Louis Saint-Rémy (général de brigade)
 Charles-Marie-Robert comte d'Escorches de Sainte Croix (général de brigade)
 Charles Saligny de San-Germano (général de division)
 Jean-Baptiste Salm (général de brigade)
 François Nicolas de Salomon (général de division)
 Antoine Salva (général de brigade)
 Thomas Chegaray de Sandos (général de brigade)
 Claude François Thomas Sandoz (général de brigade)
 Nicolas-Antoine Sanson (général de division)
 Antoine Joseph Santerre (général de division)
 Jean Sarrazin (général de division)
 Henri Amable Alexandre de Sarret (général de brigade)
 Jacques Thomas Sarrut (général de division)
 Adrien Joseph Saudeur (général de brigade)
 Louis François Saunier (général de division)
 Pierre François Sauret de la Borie (général de division)
 Jean Charles Sauriat (général de brigade)
 François Jean Sautter (général de brigade)
 Joseph Alexandre Belvèze de Larue de Sauviac (général de division)
 Anne Jean Marie René Savary, duc de Rovigo (général de division)
 Jean-Baptiste Saviot (général de brigade)
 Jean-Baptiste Auguste Reynaud de Savournin (général de brigade)
 George Ernst de Sayn et Wittgenstein (général de brigade)

Sc 

 Marie Paul Alexandre César de Scépeaux de Bois-Guignot (général de brigade)
 François Ignace Schaal (général de division)
 Christian-Henri Schaeffer (général de brigade)
 Alexis Balthazar Henri Antoine Schauenburg (général de division)
 Nicolas Joseph Scalfort (général de brigade)
 Marc Amand Élisée Scherb (général de brigade)
 Barthélemy Louis Joseph Schérer (général de division)
 Jean Jacques Schilt (général de brigade)
 Joseph François Ignace Maximilien Schiner (général de division)
 Jean-Baptiste Schlachter (général de brigade)
 Nicolas Schmitz, (général de brigade)
 Laurent Schobert (général de brigade)
 Charles Jean Theodore Schoenmezel (général de brigade)
 Nicolas Joseph Schreiber (général de brigade)
 Jean Adam Schramm (général de division)
 Jean Paul Adam Schramm (général de division)
 François Xavier de Schwarz (général de brigade)
 Henri César Auguste Schwiter (général de brigade)

Se 

 Horace François Bastien Sébastiani de La Porta (général de division)
 Étienne Vincent de Sédillot de Fontaine (général de brigade)
 Jacques Marie Blaise de Segond de Sederon (général de brigade)
 Louis-Philippe de Ségur (général de brigade)
 Philippe-Paul de Ségur (général de division)
 Jean-Baptiste Pierre de Semellé (général de division)
 Alexandre-François de Senarmont (général de division)
 Alexandre-Antoine Hureau de Senarmont (général de division)
 Louis Thomas Senneton de Chermont (général de brigade)
 Philippe Joseph Victoire de Senneville (général de brigade)
 Charles Guillaume Sepher (général de brigade)
 Jean Mathieu Seras (général de division)
 Charles Catherin Sériziat (général de brigade)
 Denis Étienne Seron (général de brigade)
 Jean Nicolas Seroux de Fay (général de division)
 Jean-Baptiste Séroux d'Agincourt (général de brigade)
 Joseph Serrant (général de brigade)
 Joseph François Régis Camille de Serre de Gras (général de brigade)
 Jean-Mathieu-Philibert Sérurier (Maréchal d'Empire)
 Joseph Servan de Gerbey (général de division)
 Filippo Severoli (général de division)
 Dominique Sheldon (général de division)

Si 

 Jacques François Sibot (général de brigade)
 Benoît Prosper Sibuet (général de brigade)
 Joseph Victorin Sicard (général de brigade)
 Jean Julien Sierawski de Gozdawa (général de brigade)
 Pierre Louis François Silly (général de brigade)
 Jean-Louis Simien (général de brigade)
 François Martin Valentin Simmer (général de division)
 Édouard François Simon (général de division)
 Henri Simon (général de brigade)
 François Simon-Grandchamps (général de brigade)
 Pierre Joseph Victor Simonneau (général de brigade)
 Léopold Prosper Philibert Sionville (général de brigade)
 Jean-Baptiste de Bressolles de Siscé (général de brigade)
 Michel François de Sistrières (général de brigade)
 Marc Slivarich de Heldenbourg (général de brigade)

So 

 Michel Sokolnicki de Nowina, comte (général de brigade)
 Pierre Sol-Beauclair (général de brigade)
 Guillaume Soland (général de brigade)
 Jean-Baptiste Solignac (général de division)
 Gabriel de Sombs de Fajac (général de brigade)
 Justinien-Victor Somis (général de division)
 Jean-Marie Songeon (général de brigade)
 Charles Louis Didier Songis l'Aîné (général de division)
 Nicolas-Marie Songis des Courbons (général de division)
 Louis Charles Barthélémy Sopransi (général de brigade)
 Jean-Barthélemot Sorbier (général de division)
 Jean Joseph Augustin Sorbier (général de brigade)
 Nicolas Thomas Sorlus-Crause (général de brigade)
 Joseph Sorlus de Bart (général de brigade)
 Joseph Souham (général de division)
 Antoine Soulheirac (général de brigade)
 Jérôme Soulès (général de brigade)
 Jean Antoine Soulier (général de brigade)
 Jean-Jacques François de Soulier (général de brigade)
 Jean-de-Dieu Soult, duc de Dalmatie (Maréchal d'Empire])
 Pierre Benoît Soult (général de division)
 Jean-Louis Soye (général de brigade)
 Louis Stanislas Xavier Soyez (général de brigade)
 Alexandre Séraphin Joseph de Sparre (général de division)
 Louis Ernest Joseph de Sparre (général de division)
 Nicolas Philippe Xavier Spital (général de brigade)

St-Su 

 Jean André Stedman (général de brigade)
 Louis Stephan (général de brigade)
 Henri Christian Michel de Stengel (général de division)
 Maximilien Ferdinand Thomas Stettenhofen (général de division)
 Adrien Guillaume Storm de Grave (général de brigade)
 Jean Baptiste Alexandre Strolz (général de division)
 Jacques Gervais, baron Subervie (général de division)
 Louis-Gabriel Suchet, duc d'Albufera (Maréchal d'Empire)
 Louis Suden (général de brigade)
 Jean Sultzmann (général de brigade)
 Louis Surreau de Calbecq (général de brigade)
 François Suzamicq (général de brigade)

T 

 Alexandre Camille Taponier (général de division)
 Jean Joseph Tarayre (général de division)
 Jean-Henri Robert Tascher de La Pagerie (général de brigade)
 Éloi Charlemagne Taupin (général de division)
 Albert Louis Valentin Taviel (général de division)
 Jean du Teil, chevalier du Teil de Beaumont (général de division)
 Germain-Felix Tennet de Laubadère (général de brigade)
 Denis Terreyre (général de brigade)
 Jacques Terrier, baron de Palante (général de brigade)
 François Antoine Teste (général de division)
 Marc Bruno Teste (général de brigade)
 Raymond Jean-Baptiste Teulet (général de brigade)
 Jean Victor Tharreau (général de division)
 Louis Marie Joseph Thévenet (général de brigade)
 Louis Michel Auguste Thévenet (général de brigade)
 François Thévenot (général de brigade)
 Jean Thévet de Lessert (général de brigade)
 Paul Charles François Adrien Henri Dieudonné Thiébault (général de division)
 Jean-François Thierry (général de division)
 Charles Désiré Thimonet des Gaudières (général de brigade)
 François Thirion (général de division)
 Nicolas Marin Thiry (général de brigade)
 Jean-Baptiste Tholmé (général de brigade)
 David-Alexis Tholosé (général de brigade)
 Jean Thomas (général de brigade)
 Adrien Martial Thomas de Saint-Henry (général de brigade)
 Jean Guillaume Barthélemy Thomières (général de brigade)
 François Joseph Thorillon du Bourg de Vacherolles (général de brigade)
 Pierre Jacques Thorin de La Thanne (général de brigade)
 Louis Adrien Théodore Thory (général de brigade)
 Jacques Thouvenot (général de brigade)
 Pierre Thouvenot (général de division)
 Henri Joseph Thurning de Ryss (général de brigade)
 Jacques Louis François Delaistre Tilly (général de division)
 Jean-Baptiste Cyrus de Timbrune de Thiembronne (général de division)
 Ralph Dundas Tindal (général de division)
 Louis Tirlet (général de division)
 Mathieu Tisson (général de brigade)
 Joseph de Tolinski (général de brigade)
 Louis de Tolozan (général de brigade)
 Louis De Tolzan (général de brigade)
 Anne Edmé Alexandre de Toulongeon (général de brigade)
 Hippolyte-Jean-René de Toulongeon (général de division)
 Charles Bertin Gaston Chapuis de Tourville (général de division)
 Antoine Étienne de Tousard (général de brigade)
 Toussaint Louverture (général de division)
 Jean François Toussaint (général de brigade)
 Étienne Jacques Travers, baron de Jever (général de brigade)
 Jean-Pierre Travot (général de division)
 Pierre Jean Treich des Farges (général de brigade)
 Anne-François-Charles Trelliard (général de division)
 Louis Jean David Trésor du Bactot (général de brigade)
 Camille Alphonse Trézel (général de division)
 Jean-Joseph Triaire (général de brigade)
 Auguste Joseph Tribout (général de division)
 François Laurent Tricotel (général de brigade)
 Sébastien Trochereau de Bouillay (général de brigade)
 Charles Trouard de Riolles (général de brigade)
 Laurent Jean François Truguet (Amiral)
 André Tudier (général de brigade)
 Jean-Henri Charles Joseph Tugnot de Lanoye (général de brigade)
 Augustin Tuncq (général de division)
 Louis Marie Turreau de Garambouville, baron de Linières (général de division)

U 

 Louis Jean Charles Urtubie (général de brigade)
 Joseph François Jean-Baptiste d'Urre de Molans (général de division)
 Théodore Bernard Simon Durtubisse (général de brigade)

V 

 Marc-Antoine Coban (général de brigade)
 François Vachot (général de brigade)
 Martial Vachot (général de division)
 Jean-Baptiste Vaillant (général de brigade)
 Daniel Thomas Olry de Valcin (général de brigade)
 Sylvain Charles Valée (général de division)
 François Valentin (général de brigade)
 Antoine Joseph Marie de Valette (général de brigade)
 Paul Isaïe Valframbert (général de brigade)
 Jean-Marie Valhubert (général de brigade)
 Jean-André Valletaux (général de brigade)
 Gabriel Théodore Vallier de Lapeyrouse (général de brigade)
 Louis Vallin (général de division)
 Guy Louis Henri de Valory (général de brigade)
 François Valterre (général de brigade)
 Dominique Vandamme, comte d'Unsebourg (général de division)
 Antoine Baudoin Gisbert Van de Dedem van de Gelder (général de division)
 Edmé-Martin Vandermaesen (général de division)
 Adrien Van Helden (général de brigade)
 Dirk Van Hogendorp (général de division)
 Jean Baptiste Van Merlen (général de brigade)
 Albert Van Ryssel (général de brigade)
 Onno Xavier Van Sandick (général de brigade)
 Pierre Jean Van Stabel (Contre-amiral)
 Louis-Prix Varé (général de brigade)
 Marie Louis de Varennes (général de brigade)
 Jean-Pierre Varin (général de brigade)
 Louis Vasserot (général de division)
 Achille Victor Fortuné de Vaufreland-Piscatory (général de brigade)
 Antoine Joseph Veaux (général de division)
 Dominique Honoré Antoine Vedel (général de division)
 Michel Veilande (général de brigade)
 Jean Gaspard de Vence (contre-amiral)
 Paul Verbigier de Saint-Paul (général de brigade)
 Jean-Antoine Verdier (général de division)
 Pierre François Verger-Dubareau (général de brigade)
 François de Vergès (général de brigade)
 Jean-Marie Vergez (général de brigade)
 Jacques Paul Vergnes (général de brigade)
 Pierre François Verne (général de brigade)
 François Vernier (général de brigade)
 César Verny (général de brigade)
 Claude Vezu (général de division)
 Honoré Vial (général de division)
 Jacques Laurent Louis Augustin Vial (général de division)
 Jean-Baptiste Théodore Vialanes ou Viallanes (général de brigade)
 Charles Guillaume Vial d'Alais (général de brigade)
 Sébastien Viala (général de brigade)
 Pierre Vialle (général de division)
 François Pierre de Viantaix (général de brigade)
 Louis Joseph Vichery (général de division)
 Pierre Marie Gabriel Vidalot du Sirat (général de brigade)
 Georges Michel Vietinghoff (général de division)
 Jean-Louis de Vieusseux (général de brigade)
Jacques-Pierre Orillard de Villemanzy (général de division)
 François Félix Vignes (général de brigade)
 Martin Vignolle (général de division)
 Jean-Baptiste Vigoureux Duplessis (général de division)
 Jean-Marie de Villaret-Joyeuse (général de brigade)
 Eugène-Casimir Villatte, comte d'Outremont (général de division)
 Jean-Louis Villatte (général de brigade)
 Pierre Justin Marchand de Villionne (général de brigade)
 Jean Joseph Villot (général de brigade)
 Michel Villot (général de brigade)
 Donatien-Marie-Joseph de Vimeur, vicomte de Rochambeau (général de division)
 Louis Antoine Vimeux (général de division)
 Henri Catherine Balthazard Vincent (général de division)
 Humbert Marie Vincent (général de brigade)
 Luc Antoine Vincent (général de brigade)
 Rémy Vincent (général de division)
 Gilbert Julian Vinot (général de brigade)
 François Charles Vireau de Sombreuil (général de division)
 Étienne Louis Vital (général de brigade)
 Guillaume Raymond Amant Viviès, baron de La Prade (général de brigade)
 Johann Hendrick Voet (général de division)
 Jean-Baptiste Voillot (général de brigade)
 Théophile Voirol (général de brigade)
 François Pierre Félix Vonderweidt (général de brigade)
 Marie Joseph Simon Alexis Vonderweidt (général de brigade)
 Alexandre Voulland (général de division)
 Denis Félix de Vrigny (général de brigade)

W 

 Frédéric Henri Walther (général de division)
 Jean Thomas Ward (général de brigade)
 Nicolas Daniel Warel de Beauvoir (général de division)
 Jean-Baptiste Warnesson de Grandchamps (général de brigade)
 Pierre Watier, comte de Saint-Alphonse (général de division)
 François Isidore Wathiez (général de division)
 François Watrin (général de division)
 Erhard Gustave de Wedel (général de brigade)
 François Werlé (général de brigade)
 Jean Guillaume Chrétien Wernecke (général de brigade)
 François-Joseph Westermann (général de brigade)
 Joseph Wielhorski de Kierdeja (général de division)
 Amédée Willot (général de division)
 Georges Félix de Wimpffen (général de division)
 François Louis de Wimpffen de Bornebourg (général de division)
 Jean-Guillaume de Winter (général de brigade)
 Louis Wirion (général de brigade)
 Jean-Christophe Wisch (général de division)
 Charles Victor Woirgard (général de brigade)
 Marc François Jérôme Wolff (général de division)
 Jan Henryk Wołodkowicz (général de brigade)
 Armand Nicolas Wouillemont de Vivier (général de brigade)
 Carl Philipp von Wrede (Lieutenant général)
 Maximilien Constantin de Wurmser (général de brigade)

X 

 Charles Antoine Dominique Xaintrailles, comte de Lauthier (général de division)

Y 

 Jean-Frédéric Yvendorff (général de brigade)

Z 

 Józef Zajączek (général de division)
 Joseph Camille Jules Zenardi (général de brigade)
 Christian Noël de Zimmerman (général de brigade)
 Édouard Zoltowski de Ogonczyk (général de brigade)
 Carlo Zucchi (général de brigade)

See also 
 List of French general officers (Peninsular War)

References

Further reading 
 Georges Six, Dictionnaire biographique des Généraux et Amiraux de la Révolution et de l'Empire (1792-1814), 2 Tomes, Librairie Historique et Nobiliaire, Georges Saffroy, Paris, 1934 (réédition 1974).
 Louis Chardigny, Les maréchaux de Napoléon, Bibliothèque Napoléonienne, Tallandier, 1977

External links 
 Delphine Étienne, Alain Guéna, Répertoire alphabétique des officiers généraux de l’Armée de terre et des services (Ancien Régime-2010), Service historique de l’armée, 2010

French revolutionary
Generals